= Huntington =

Huntington may refer to:

== Places ==
=== Canada ===
- Huntington, Nova Scotia

=== New Zealand ===
- Huntington, New Zealand a suburb in Hamilton, New Zealand

=== United Kingdom ===
- Huntington, Cheshire, England
- Huntington, East Lothian, Scotland
- Huntington, Hereford, England
- Huntington, Kington, England
- Huntington, North Yorkshire, England
- Huntington, Shropshire, England
- Huntington, Staffordshire, England

=== United States ===
- Huntington, Arkansas
- Huntington, Connecticut
- Huntington, Marion County, Florida
- Huntington, Putnam County, Florida
- Huntington, Georgia
- Huntington County, Indiana
- Huntington, Indiana, seat of Huntington County, Indiana
- Huntington, Iowa
- Huntington, Maryland (disambiguation), two places
- Huntington, Massachusetts, a New England town
  - Huntington (CDP), Massachusetts, the main village in the town
- Huntington, Missouri
- Huntington, Nevada, ghost town
- Huntington, New York, the most populous settlement named Huntington
  - Huntington Bay, New York, a village in Huntington, New York
  - Huntington (CDP), New York, a hamlet in Huntington, New York
  - Huntington Railroad
- Huntington, Oregon
- Huntington, Texas
- Huntington, Utah
- Huntington, Vermont, a New England town
  - Huntington (CDP), Vermont, village in the town
  - Huntington Center, Vermont, another village in the town
- Huntington, Virginia
  - Huntington (Washington Metro), a Washington Metro station in Huntington, Virginia
- Huntington, West Virginia
- Huntington, Wisconsin

== Other uses ==
- Huntington (name)
- Huntington (film), a black comedy thriller written and directed by John Patton Ford
- Huntington's disease, an inherited neurological disorder
- Huntington Bancshares, a bank headquartered in Columbus, Ohio
- Huntington Library (disambiguation)
- Huntington Avenue Grounds, a baseball stadium that formerly stood in Boston, Massachusetts
- Huntington Hotel (disambiguation), multiple hotels
- Huntington University, a school in Huntington, Indiana
- Huntington Middle School, a public middle school in Warner Robins, Georgia

== See also ==
- Huntingdon (disambiguation)
- Huntingtown (disambiguation)
- Huntington Station (disambiguation)
- Huntington Township (disambiguation)
- Justice Huntington (disambiguation)
