= Huntingdon (disambiguation) =

Huntingdon is a market town in Cambridgeshire, England.

Huntingdon may also refer to:

== Places ==
=== Canada ===
- Huntingdon, Abbotsford, a community in British Columbia on the US border
- Huntingdon, Quebec, a town
  - Huntingdon (federal electoral district), a federal electoral district
  - Huntingdon (Quebec provincial electoral district)

=== New Zealand ===
- Huntingdon, New Zealand, a lightly populated locality

=== United Kingdom ===
- Huntingdon (UK Parliament constituency)
- Huntingdon Road in Cambridge, England

=== United States ===
- Huntingdon County, Pennsylvania
  - Huntingdon, Pennsylvania, a borough and the county seat
- Huntingdon, Tennessee, a town

== People ==
- Henry of Huntingdon, 12th-century historian and archbishop
- Huntingdon Beaumont (c.1560–1624), English coalmining entrepreneur
- John Huntingdon (preacher) (fl. 16th century), English preacher
- Selina Hastings, Countess of Huntingdon, (1707–91), religious leader, founder of Countess of Huntingdon's Connexion
- Terry Huntingdon (born 1940), American beauty pageant titleholder

== Other ==
- Earl of Huntingdon, a title in the Peerage of England
- The Huntingdon, a skyscraper in Houston, Texas
- Huntingdon (Boyce, Virginia), a plantation home listed on the National Register of Historic Places
- Huntingdon (Roanoke, Virginia), a plantation home listed on the National Register of Historic Places
- Huntingdon station (disambiguation), stations of the name
- Huntingdon College, a liberal-arts college located in Montgomery, Alabama, United States of America
- Huntingdon Life Sciences (HLS), an animal-testing laboratory based in Huntingdon, England
- Helen Graham (The Tenant of Wildfell Hall) (married name Huntingdon), the main female protagonist of Anne Brontë's novel The Tenant of Wildfell Hall; also Arthur Huntingdon and Arthur Huntingdon, Jr., her husband and their child respectively

== See also ==
- Huntington (disambiguation)
- Huntingtown (disambiguation)
