= George Rawdon (MP) =

Member of Parliament for Lincoln
- In office 14 May 1796 – 25 April 1800

Personal details
- Born: January 9, 1761
- Died: April 25, 1800 (aged 39)
- Parent(s): John Rawdon, 1st Earl of Moira; Elizabeth Hastings, 13th Baroness Hastings
- Relatives: Francis Rawdon-Hastings, 1st Marquess of Hastings (brother); John Theophilus Rawdon (brother)

George Rawdon (9 January 1761 – 25 April 1800) was a British politician who served as member of parliament for Lincoln from 1796 to 1800.

== Personal life ==
Rawdon was born as the third son of John Rawdon, 1st Earl of Moira and Elizabeth Rawdon, Countess of Moira.

== Military Career ==
He followed his older brothers Francis Rawdon-Hastings, 1st Marquess of Hastings and John Theophilus Rawdon into the British Army, joining the 9th Regiment of Foot as an ensign in 1776. He became a lieutenant later that year, and appears on General John Burgoyne's list of officers at the surrender of Saratoga in 1777. In 1778, he was appointed a captain in the 63rd Regiment of Foot.

== See also ==
- List of MPs elected in the 1796 British general election
