= John Huntingdon =

John Huntingdon may refer to:

- John Huntingdon (preacher)
- John Huntingdon (MP) for Stafford (UK Parliament constituency)
- John of Scotland, Earl of Huntingdon
- John Holand, Earl of Huntingdon
