= Huntingtons =

Huntingtons may refer to:

- Huntington's disease, a genetic disorder
- The Huntingtons, a punk rock band

== See also ==
- Huntington (disambiguation)
