= Francis Hastings, 10th Earl of Huntingdon =

British peer and politician (1729–1789)

Francis Hastings PC
- Earl of Huntingdon
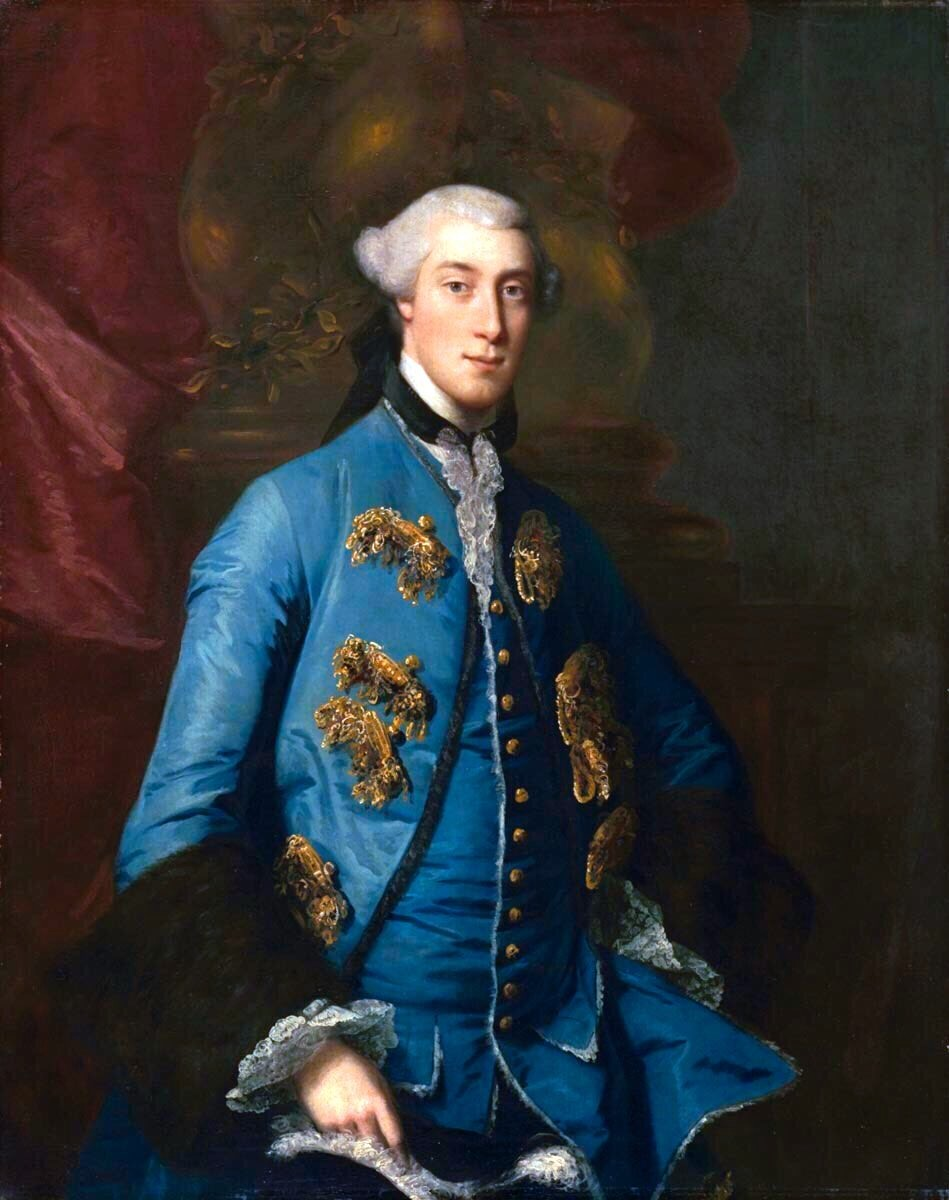
- Portrait by Sir Joshua Reynolds, 1754
- Born: 13 March 1729
- Died: 2 October 1789 (aged 60)
- Issue: Sir Charles Hastings, 1st Baronet
- Father: 9th Earl of Huntingdon
- Mother: Lady Selina Shirley

Francis Hastings, 10th Earl of Huntingdon PC (13 March 1729 – 2 October 1789) was a British peer and politician.

== Life ==
He was the eldest of seven children of the 9th Earl of Huntingdon and his wife, Lady Selina, a leader of the Methodist evangelical revival. Hastings was eighteen when he succeeded as Earl of Huntingdon and Baron Botreaux on his father's demise in 1746. The earl never married but did father an illegitimate son, Charles, by a Parisian girl named Mademoiselle Lany, a dancer at the Opera whilst on his Grand Tour with his friend David Murray, 7th Viscount Stormont in 1747 (which was sponsored by the 4th Earl of Chesterfield). In August 1752, Huntingdon left Paris for Spain, where his self-importance irritated the British minister, Sir Benjamin Keene. He visited Gibraltar (April 1753) and Lisbon (May 1753) before returning to England in early July 1753. The following July, he left England for a second, two-year tour of the continent. In Italy, he studied antiquities with the antiquarian Antonio Cocchi (a friend of his late father), as well as Joseph Wilton and the Abbé Venuti.

On his return from the continent, Hastings did well at the Royal Court, as a descendant of George, Duke of Clarence, brother of King Edward IV, seemed to assure him and he was appointed Master of the Horse in 1760. He was a Bearer of the Sword of State at George III's coronation in 1761, though the Sword of State itself was mislaid and he instead had to carry the Lord Mayor of London's Pearl Sword. He became Groom of the Stole, also in 1761. In particular, the Earl of Chesterfield, oversaw each step in the social and intellectual education of young Huntingdon, whom he praised as "the bright exemplar of the union of a scholar with the man of the world." In 1762, he incorrectly announced to the King that his first-born child (Prince George) by the Queen was a girl. The error was doubly unfortunate at the time, as the King had hoped for a male heir and he also promised £1,000 to the bearer of the news that he had a son and £500 that he had a girl (Huntingdon did not receive either). In 1766, he launched a claim to the royal Dukedom of Clarence that preoccupied him for the rest of his life. He died suddenly on 2 October 1789, at the London house of his nephew, Francis Rawdon. On his death in 1789, the earldom became dormant. He was succeeded in the baronies of Hastings, Hungerford, de Moleyns and Botreaux by his sister Lady Elizabeth, wife of John Rawdon, 1st Earl of Moira. Huntingdon was a Fellow of the Royal Society in 1758 and of the Society of Antiquaries in 1768.

== Citations ==
Honorary titles
Preceded by The Earl Gower	Master of the Horse; 1760 – 1761	Succeeded by The Duke of Rutland
Preceded by The Marquess of Rockingham	Lord Lieutenant of the West Riding of Yorkshire; 1763 – 1765	Succeeded by The Marquess of Rockingham
Court offices
Preceded by The Earl of Bute	Groom of the Stole; 1761 – 1770	Succeeded by The Earl of Bristol
Peerage of England
Preceded by Theophilus Hastings	Earl of Huntingdon; 1746 – 1789	Succeeded by Theophilus Hastings
Preceded by Theophilus Hastings	Baron Botreaux; 1746 – 1789	Succeeded by Elizabeth Rawdon
