= Huntington metropolitan area =

The Huntington metropolitan area may refer to:

- The Huntington, West Virginia metropolitan area, United States
- The Huntington, Indiana micropolitan area, United States

== See also ==
- Huntington (disambiguation)
