= John Theophilus Rawdon =

British politician

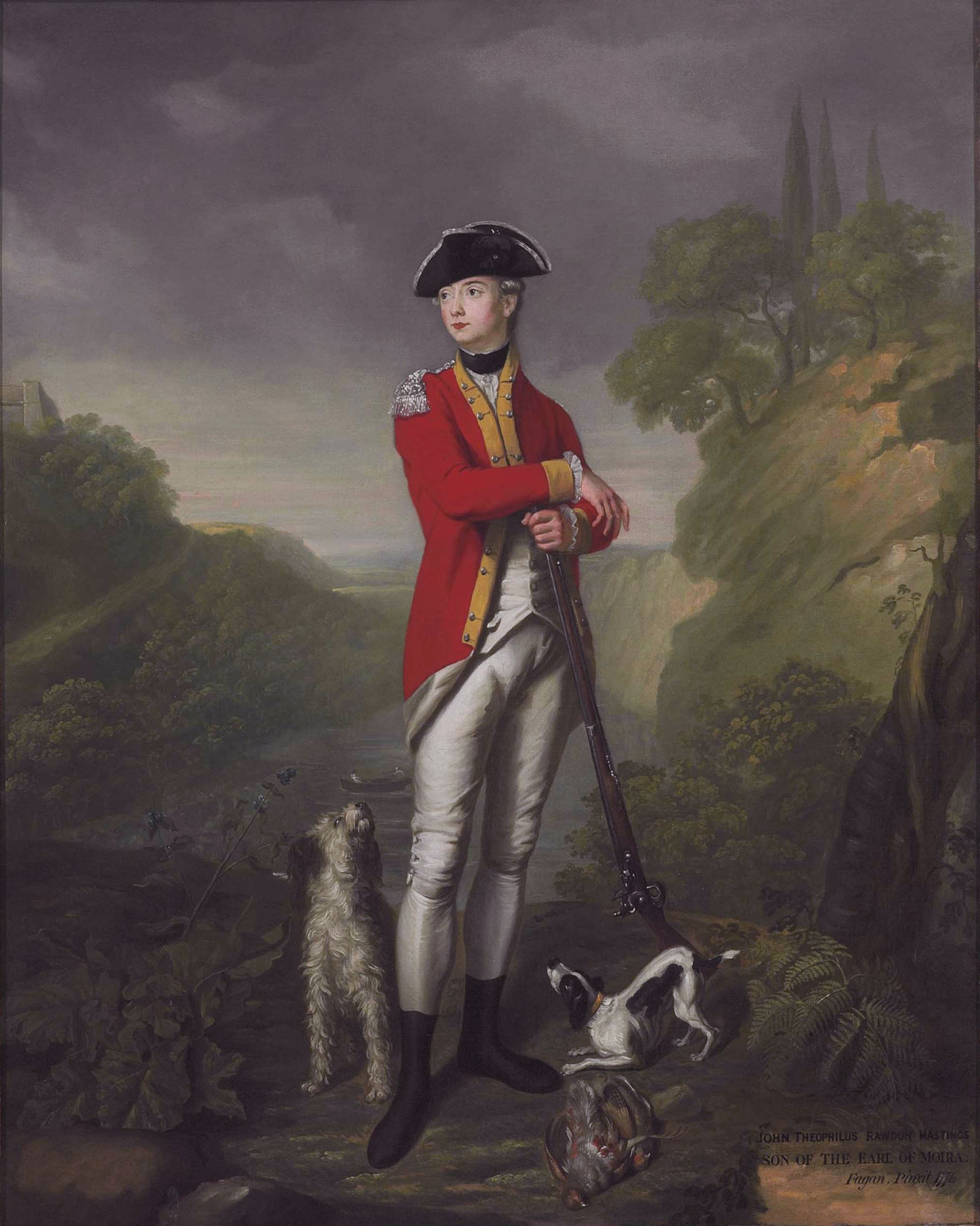

Member of Parliament for ApplebyMember of Parliament for Launceston
- In office May 18, 1791 – 1802

Personal details
- Born: November 19, 1756
- Died: May 5, 1808 (aged 51)
- Spouse: Frances Hall
- Children: 2
- Parent(s): John Rawdon, 1st Earl of Moira; Elizabeth Hastings, 13th Baroness Hastings
- Relatives: Francis Rawdon-Hastings, 1st Marquess of Hastings (brother); George Rawdon (brother)

John Theophilus Rawdon (19 November 1756 – May 5, 1808) was a British politician who served as member of parliament for Appleby from 1791 to 1796, and for Launceston from 1796 to 1802.

== Personal life ==
Rawdon was born as the second son of John Rawdon, 1st Earl of Moira and Elizabeth Rawdon, Countess of Moira.

== Military career ==
He followed his older brother Francis Rawdon-Hastings, 1st Marquess of Hastings and into the British Army, joining the 15th Regiment of Foot as an ensign in 1773. He became a lieutenant in late 1776, and was slightly injured in a skirmish in the aftermath of the White Plains, when a cannonball struck two men close to him and fragmented a piece of skull into his knee.

In 1777, Rawdon was appointed a captain in the 4th Regiment of Foot, and suffered the amputation of his leg after being shot in the knee at the Battle of Brandywine. After recovering, he served as captain of a garrison on the Isle of Wight.

== Political career ==
In 1796, Rawdon voted against abolition of the slave trade, in contrast to his brother Francis.

In 1801, Rawdon was found to be living in Vienna, described as ‘a strange though a dull man’ with a ‘cork leg’ and ‘a coquettish sort of wife’.

== Marriage and issue ==
Rawdon married Frances Hall in 1792 and had at least two children: Elizabeth, Lady William Russell (2 October 1793 – 10 August 1874) and Frances Charlotte Rawdon (b. February 2 1795).

== See also ==
- List of MPs elected in the 1796 British general election
