= Westchester Square, Bronx =

Neighborhood in New York City

Westchester Square
- Neighborhood of the Bronx
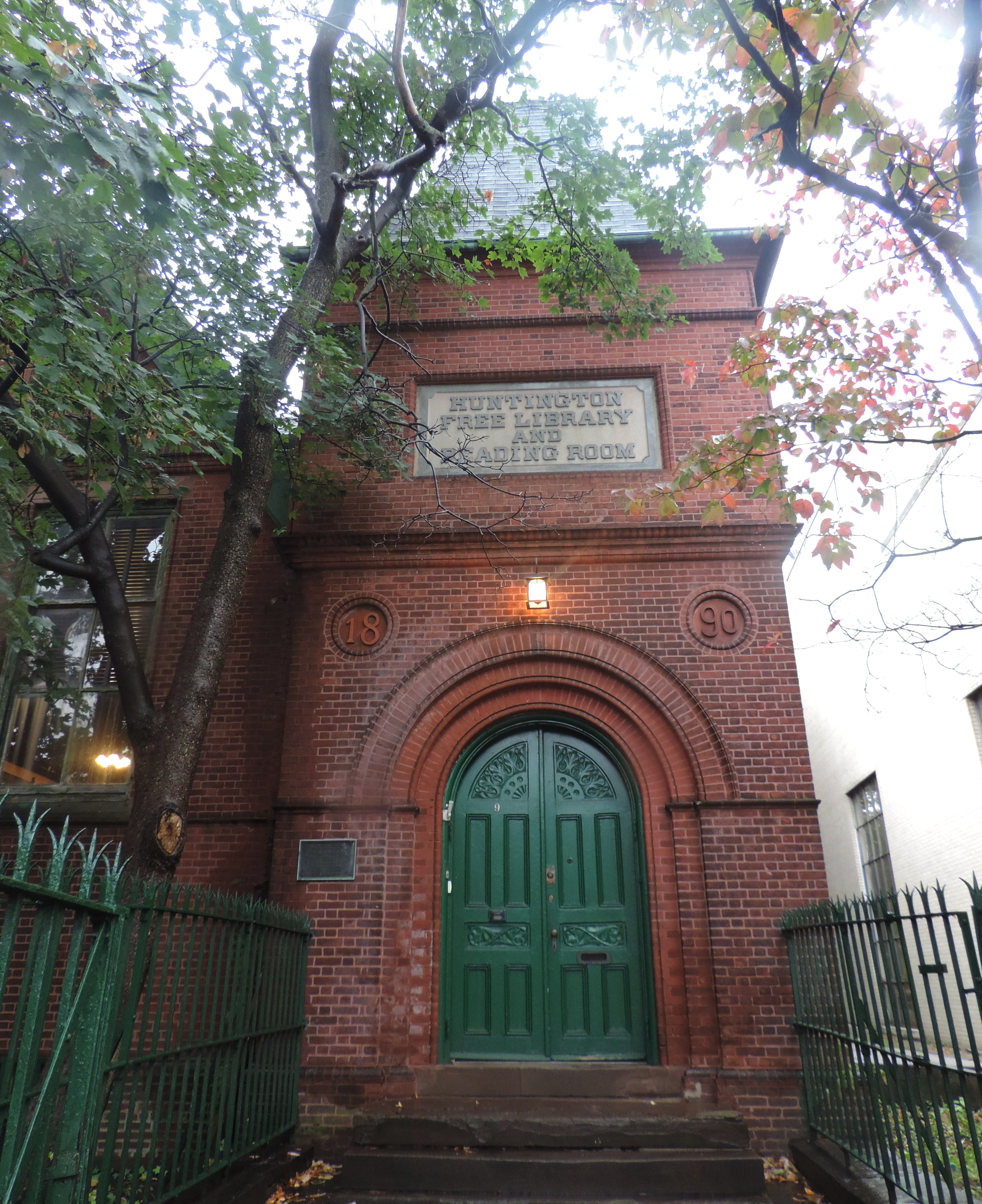
- The front door to the historic Huntington Free Library on Lane Avenue
- Location in New York City
- Coordinates: 40.84124°N 73.84324°W
- Country: United States
- State: New York
- City: New York City
- Borough: The Bronx
- Community District: Bronx 10

Economics
- ZIP Codes: 10461, 10462
- Area code: 718, 347, 929, and 917
- Website: www.westchestersquare.nyc

Westchester Square is a residential neighborhood geographically located in the eastern section of the New York City borough of the Bronx. Its boundaries, starting from the north and moving clockwise are: East Tremont Avenue and Silver Street, Blondell Avenue and Westchester Creek to the east, Waterbury Avenue to the south and Castle Hill Avenue to the west. The main roadways through Westchester Square are East Tremont Avenue, Westchester Avenue and Williamsbridge Road.

The neighborhood is part of Bronx Community District 10, and its ZIP Codes include 10461 and 10462. The area is patrolled by the 45th Precinct of the New York City Police Department.

== History ==
The village was founded about 1654 by English settlers who left New Haven Colony for Dutch New Netherland, on land purchased by Thomas Pell in 1654 from the sachem Ann-hock, alias Wampage, and other Native Americans, although his right to do so was disputed by the Dutch who also laid claim to the land. The settlers followed the Westchester Creek to a path behind what is now Herbert H. Lehman High School to where the Square is now. The settlement was called Oostdorp, or East Towne, and called Westchester by the English settlers.

In a war in 1655 between the Dutch and Native Americans, the Dutch suspected the settlers of Oostdorp of working with the Esopus and Woppinger Indians and being instigators, so as to drive the Dutch from the area. In addition, they were in communication with the New Haven Colony, which drove Peter Stuyvesant to order their removal and the destruction of their homes in March 1656. Twenty-three men were placed on board the ship de Waagh ("the Scales") and taken to New Amsterdam, where they were held prisoner on the ship Ballance. According to one account, they were "fed with rotten provision, creeping with worms, whereby some of them remained diseased to this day, after which they were carried away in chaines and laid in their dungeon at Manhatoes." Shortly afterwards, the settlers agreed to submit to Dutch law and authority and were permitted to remain at Westchester. Thomas Wheeler, Thomas Newman, and John Lord were selected as the first magistrates. At that time, the town consisted of twenty-five men and ten to twelve women.

The village was the town seat of the Town of Westchester (the town hall being located at 40.842753°N 73.844356°W) until 1895, when that town became part of greater New York City. The Square is still laid out like a village, with the Owen Dolen Plaza, previously the village green, once again a central feature of the community. There are still many 19th-century homes throughout the neighborhood, including several old Victorian mansions, as well as the Huntington Free Library and Reading Room on the west side of the square. In 1920, the Interborough Rapid Transit Company's Pelham elevated line was opened with a stop at Westchester Square–East Tremont Avenue.

The Westchester Square BID (business improvement district) was formally signed into law in March 2012. Led by business owner John Bonizio, the BID is funded by landlords and shopkeepers who pay a special property tax assessment to the city. It helps to patrol and promote the immediate shopping corridor.

== Demographics ==
For census purposes, the New York City government classifies Westchester Square as part of a larger neighborhood tabulation area called Van Nest/Morris Park/Westchester Square. Based on data from the 2010 United States census, the population of Van Nest/Morris Park/Westchester Square was 29,250, a change of 2,115 (7.2%) from the 27,135 counted in 2000. Covering an area of 829.61 acres (335.73 ha), the neighborhood had a population density of 35.3 inhabitants per acre (22,600/sq mi; 8,700/km^{2}). The racial makeup of the neighborhood was 27.3% (7,987) White, 11.1% (3,245) African American, 0.3% (82) Native American, 10.6% (3,100) Asian, 0.1% (15) Pacific Islander, 1% (292) from other races, and 1.4% (410) from two or more races. Hispanic or Latino of any race were 48.3% (14,119) of the population.

== Police and crime ==
Westchester Square and Co-op City are patrolled by the 45th Precinct of the NYPD, located at 2877 Barkley Avenue in Throggs Neck. The 45th Precinct ranked 28th safest out of 69 patrol areas for per-capita crime in 2010.

The 45th Precinct has a lower crime rate than in the 1990s, with crimes across all categories having decreased by 67% between 1990 and 2022. The precinct reported five murders, 13 rapes, 235 robberies, 265 felony assaults, 108 burglaries, 609 grand larcenies, and 323 grand larcenies auto in 2022.

== Fire safety ==
Westchester Square is served by the New York City Fire Department (FDNY)'s Squad 61/Battalion 20, located at 1518 Williamsbridge Road.

== Post office and ZIP Codes ==
Westchester Square is located within ZIP Code 10461 northeast of Zerega Avenue and 10462 southwest of Zerega Avenue. The United States Postal Service operates the Westchester Station post office at 2619 Ponton Avenue.

== Arts and culture ==
The Bronx Academy of Arts and Dance is located on the grounds of St. Peter's Episcopal Church in Westchester Square.

The Bronx Council on the Arts (BCA) Headquarters is located at 2700 East Tremont Avenue in Westchester Square. A pioneering advocate for cultural equity since 1962, BCA nurtures the development of a diverse array of artists and arts organizations and builds strong cultural connections in and beyond The Bronx. As of 2024, the Longwood Art Gallery is located within BCA HQ. The gallery is part of the Longwood Arts Project, a flagship program of BCA. Founded in 1981, it was one of the first alternative gallery spaces in The Bronx and to this day maintains its pioneering focus on artists whose traditions and cultural practices are underrepresented by mainstream venues.

== Parks and recreation ==
- Owen Dolen Park is bordered by Westchester Avenue, Lane Avenue and Williamsbridge Road. It was recently renovated and rededicated in June 2013. The $4.72 million renovation of the park was started in September 2011. It was named after Owen Dolen a lifelong community resident and teacher, in 1926. Dolen had died of a heart attack a year earlier after giving a speech at the Square to unveil a granite memorial honoring neighborhood soldiers killed in World War I.
- The name for the Pearly Gates Playground is derived from Christian tradition of the entranceway through which souls enter Heaven after death. The pearly gates are said to be guarded by Saint Peter, one of the founders of the Christian Church. The playground is named the Pearly Gates, because of its location on St. Peter's Avenue. The playground originally opened in 1952 under the joint operation of Parks and the Board of Education. The park was originally called the Westchester Playground until 1998, when Parks Commissioner Henry Stern renamed the site The Pearly Gates.

== Libraries ==
The Huntington Free Library is a non-circulating, privately operated library at 9 Westchester Square. It is one of the oldest libraries in the Bronx. It remains largely unchanged from its opening in the 1890s, although it formerly contained a large Native American collection. The library includes a special collection of books and photographs on local Bronx history, as well as a collection contains current newspapers, magazines, and reference books.

The New York Public Library (NYPL)'s Westchester Square branch is a circulating branch of the NYPL located at 2521 Glebe Avenue. The branch started operating in 1937 and moved to its current two-story location in 1956. There are plans to move the Westchester Square branch to the Huntington Library annex.

== Transportation ==
Looking west bound on the Westchester Square platform with St. Peter's church in the distance.

The following New York City Subway stations serve Westchester Square:

- Westchester Square–East Tremont Avenue (6 and <6> trains)
- Zerega Avenue (6 and <6> trains)
- Castle Hill Avenue (6 and <6> trains)

The following MTA Regional Bus Operations bus routes serve Westchester Square:

- Bx4: to Westchester Square (6 and <6>) or Third Avenue–149th Street (2 and 5 trains) (via Westchester Avenue)
- Bx4A: to Westchester Square (6 train) or Simpson Street (2 and 5 trains) (via Westchester Avenue and Metropolitan Oval)
- Bx8: to Williamsbridge or Locust Point (via Williamsbridge Road)
- Bx21: to Third Avenue–138th Street (via Morris Park Avenue)
- Bx24: to Country Club or Hutchinson Metro Center
- Bx31: to Woodlawn (via Eastchester Road)
- Bx40/Bx42: to Throggs Neck or Morris Heights (via 180th Street, Burnside Avenue, Tremont Avenue)
