= Huntington Library (disambiguation) =

The Huntington Library, Art Museum and Botanical Gardens is a collections-based educational and research institution in San Marino, California, United States.

Huntington Library may also refer to:

- Huntington Beach Public Library, the library system in California, US
- Huntington Free Library and Reading Room, the private library in the Bronx, New York

== See also ==
- Huntington University (United States), the botanical garden in Huntington, Indiana
