= Huntingtown =

Huntingtown may refer to:

== Places ==
- Huntingtown, Connecticut, United States of America
- Huntingtown, Maryland, United States of America
  - Huntingtown High School, in the above community

== See also ==
- Huntingdon (disambiguation)
- Huntington (disambiguation)
