= John Rawdon, 1st Earl of Moira =

Irish peer (1720–1793)

John Rawdon, 1st Earl of Moira (17 March 1720 – 20 June 1793), known as Sir John Rawdon, Bt, between 1724 and 1750 and as The Lord Rawdon between 1750 and 1762, was an Irish peer.

== Background ==
Rawdon was the only son of Sir John Rawdon, 3rd Baronet and Dorothy (daughter of Sir Richard Levinge, 1st Baronet, Chief Justice of the Irish Common Pleas and his first wife, Mary Corbin).

== Career ==
Rawdon succeeded his father in the baronetcy in February 1724, aged three. His mother remarried Charles Cobbe, Archbishop of Dublin, and died in childbirth in 1733.

In 1750 he was elevated to the Peerage of Ireland as Baron Rawdon, of Moira in the County of Down. In 1761 he was further honoured when he was made Earl of Moira in the Irish peerage.

== Family ==
Lord Moira married, firstly, Helena Perceval (1718–1746), daughter of John Perceval, 1st Earl of Egmont and Lady Catherine Parker, on 10 November 1741. They had three children:

- Lady Helena Rawdon, married Stephen Moore, 1st Earl Mountcashell and had issue.
- Lady Catherine Rawdon (b. 27 May 1744), married Joseph Henry.
- Lady Dorothea Rawdon (b. 17 October 1745)

Helena "died at the Hotwell, near Bristol, of the consumption" in June 1746. Lord Moira married, secondly, Anne Hill, daughter of Trevor Hill, 1st Viscount Hillsborough and Mary Rowe, on 23 December 1746. They had no children.

After her death in August 1751, he married, thirdly, Elizabeth Hastings, 16th Baroness Botreaux, daughter of Theophilus Hastings, 9th Earl of Huntingdon and Lady Selina Shirley, on 26 February 1752. They were cousins, her grandmother Mary Levinge being his aunt. They had five children:

- Lady Selina Frances Rawdon (d. 1827), married George Forbes, 6th Earl of Granard and had issue.
- Lady Charlotte Adelaide Constantia Rawdon (d. 1834), married Hamilton Fitzgerald. In 1800, the royal House of Bourbon being in exile from France, Lady Charlotte's hand was sought in marriage by one of that dynasty's cadet princes, Antoine Philippe d'Orléans, Duc de Montpensier, but he was refused authorisation by Louis, Count of Provence (the future King Louis XVIII), and the marriage did not occur.
- Lady Anne Elizabeth Rawdon (1753–1813), married Thomas Brudenell-Bruce, 1st Earl of Ailesbury without issue.

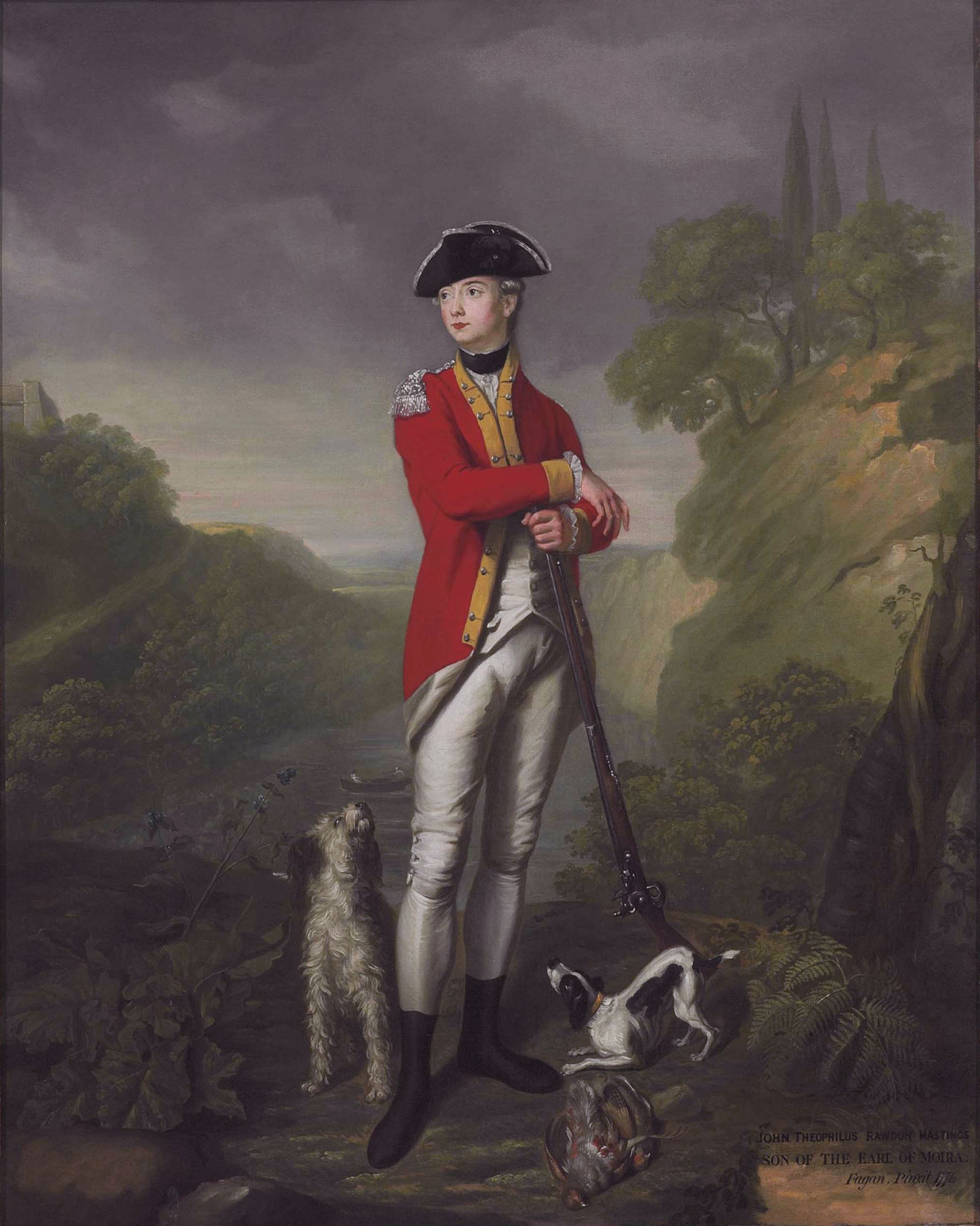
John Theophilus Rawdon (John Trotter, 1776)

- Francis Rawdon-Hastings, 1st Marquess of Hastings (1754–1826)
- Hon. John Theophilus Rawdon (1756–1808), father of Elizabeth, Lady William Russell
- Hon. George Rawdon (1761–1800)

Lord Moira died in June 1793, aged 73, and was succeeded by his eldest son by his third marriage, Francis, who had already been created Baron Rawdon in his own right in 1783 and was created Marquess of Hastings in 1816. The Countess of Moira died in April 1808.

Peerage of Ireland
New title	Earl of Moira; 1762–1793	Succeeded by Francis Rawdon-Hastings
New title	Baron Rawdon; 1750–1793	Succeeded by Francis Rawdon-Hastings
Baronetage of England
Preceded by John Rawdon	Baronet (of Moira); 1724–1793	Succeeded by Francis Rawdon-Hastings
