= Huntingdon station =

Huntingdon station may refer to:

- Huntingdon railway station, a train station in Huntingdon, Cambridgeshire, England
- Huntingdon station (Amtrak), an Amtrak station in Huntingdon, Pennsylvania, USA
- Huntingdon station (SEPTA), a SEPTA rapid transit station in Philadelphia, Pennsylvania, USA

== See also ==
- Huntingdon (disambiguation)
- Huntington Station (disambiguation)
