= Francis Rawdon-Hastings, 1st Marquess of Hastings =

British Army officer, politician and colonial administrator (1754–1826)

General The Most Honourable The Marquess of Hastings KG PC
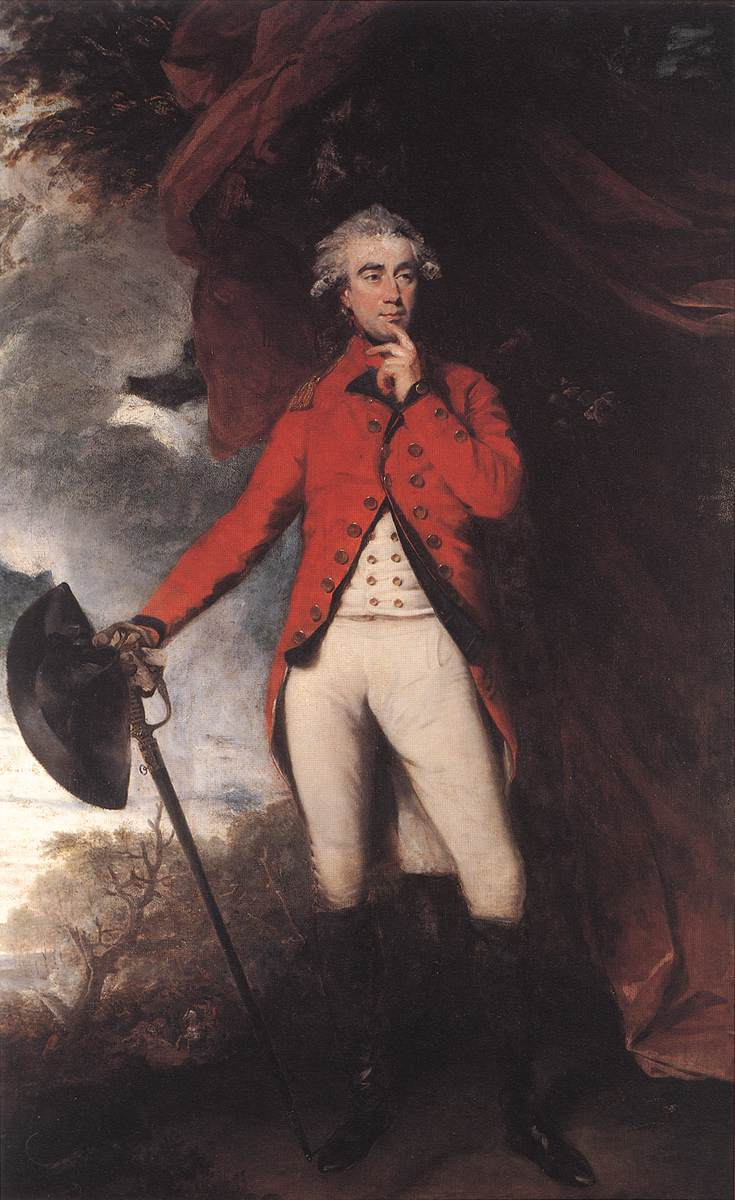
- Portrait of Lord Moira by Sir Joshua Reynolds, c. 1790

Governor-General of the Presidency of Fort William
- In office 4 October 1813 – 9 January 1823
- Monarchs: George III; George IV
- Preceded by: The Lord Minto
- Succeeded by: John Adam; As Acting Governor-General

Governor of Malta
- In office 22 March 1824 – 28 November 1826
- Monarch: George IV
- Preceded by: Hon. Thomas Maitland
- Succeeded by: Alexander George Woodford; As Acting Governor

Personal details
- Born: 9 December 1754 County Down, Ireland
- Died: 28 November 1826 (aged 71) At sea off Naples
- Spouse(s): Flora Campbell, 6th Countess of Loudoun (1780–1840)
- Children: 6
- Parent(s): John Rawdon, 1st Earl of Moira; Elizabeth Hastings, 13th Baroness Hastings

Military service
- Allegiance: Great Britain; United Kingdom
- Branch/service: British Army
- Years of service: 1771–1826
- Rank: General
- Unit: 15th Regiment of Foot; 5th Regiment of Foot
- Commands: Volunteers of Ireland; Commander-in-Chief, India
- Battles/wars: American War of Independence; War of the First Coalition; Anglo-Nepalese War; Third Anglo-Maratha War

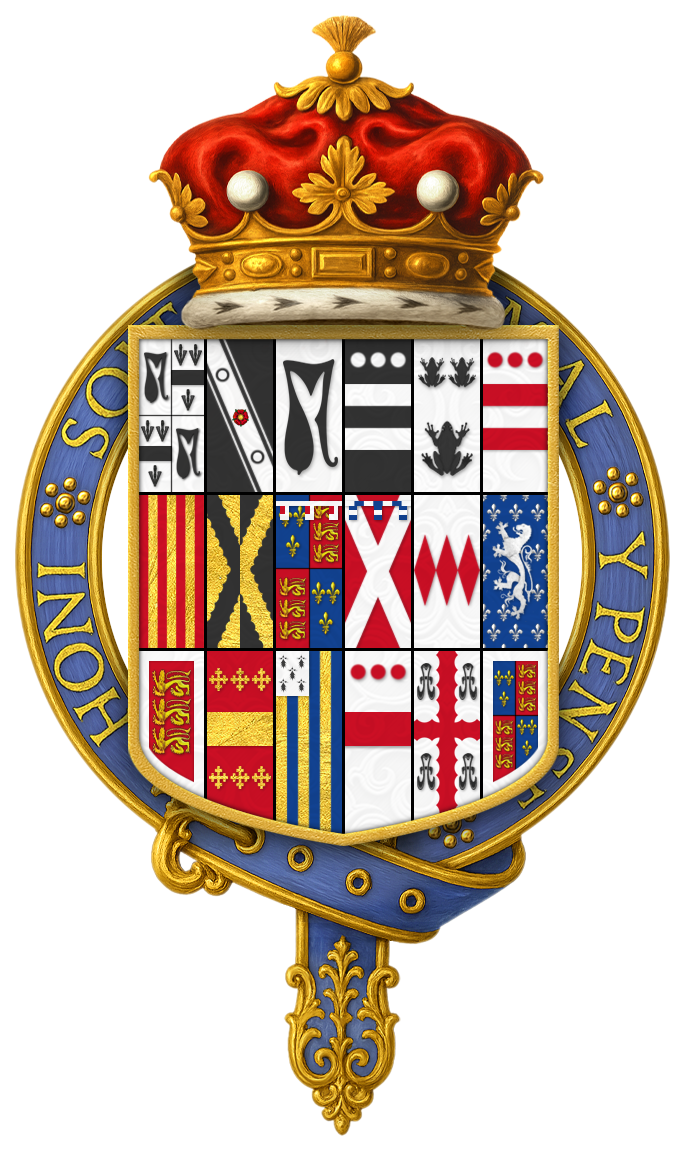
Quartered arms of Francis Rawdon-Hastings, 1st Marquess of Hastings, KG, PC

General Francis Edward Rawdon-Hastings, 1st Marquess of Hastings (9 December 1754 – 28 November 1826), styled The Honourable Francis Rawdon from birth until 1762, Lord Rawdon between 1762 and 1783, The Lord Rawdon from 1783 to 1793 and The Earl of Moira between 1793 and 1816, was a British Army officer, politician and colonial administrator who served as Governor-General of Fort William from 1813 to 1823. He had also served with British forces for years during the American War of Independence and in 1794 during the War of the First Coalition. In Ireland, he was critical of the policy of coercion used to break the United Irish movement for representative government and national independence. He took the additional surname "Hastings" in 1790 in compliance with the will of his maternal uncle, Francis Hastings, 10th Earl of Huntingdon.

== Background, education and early military career ==
Hastings was born at Moira, County Down, the son of John Rawdon, 1st Earl of Moira and Elizabeth Hastings, 13th Baroness Hastings, who was a daughter of the 9th Earl of Huntingdon. He was baptised at St. Audoen's Church, Dublin, on 2 January 1755. He grew up in Moira and in Dublin. He joined the British Army on 7 August 1771 as an ensign in the 15th Regiment of Foot (the going rate for purchasing a commission for this rank was £200). From that time on his life was spent entirely in the service of his country. He was at Harrow School and matriculated at University College, Oxford, but dropped out. He became friends there with Banastre Tarleton. With his uncle Lord Huntingdon, he went on the Grand Tour. On 20 October 1773, he was promoted to lieutenant in the 5th Regiment of Foot. He returned to England to join his regiment, and sailed for America on 7 May 1774.

== American War of Independence ==
=== Battle of Bunker Hill ===
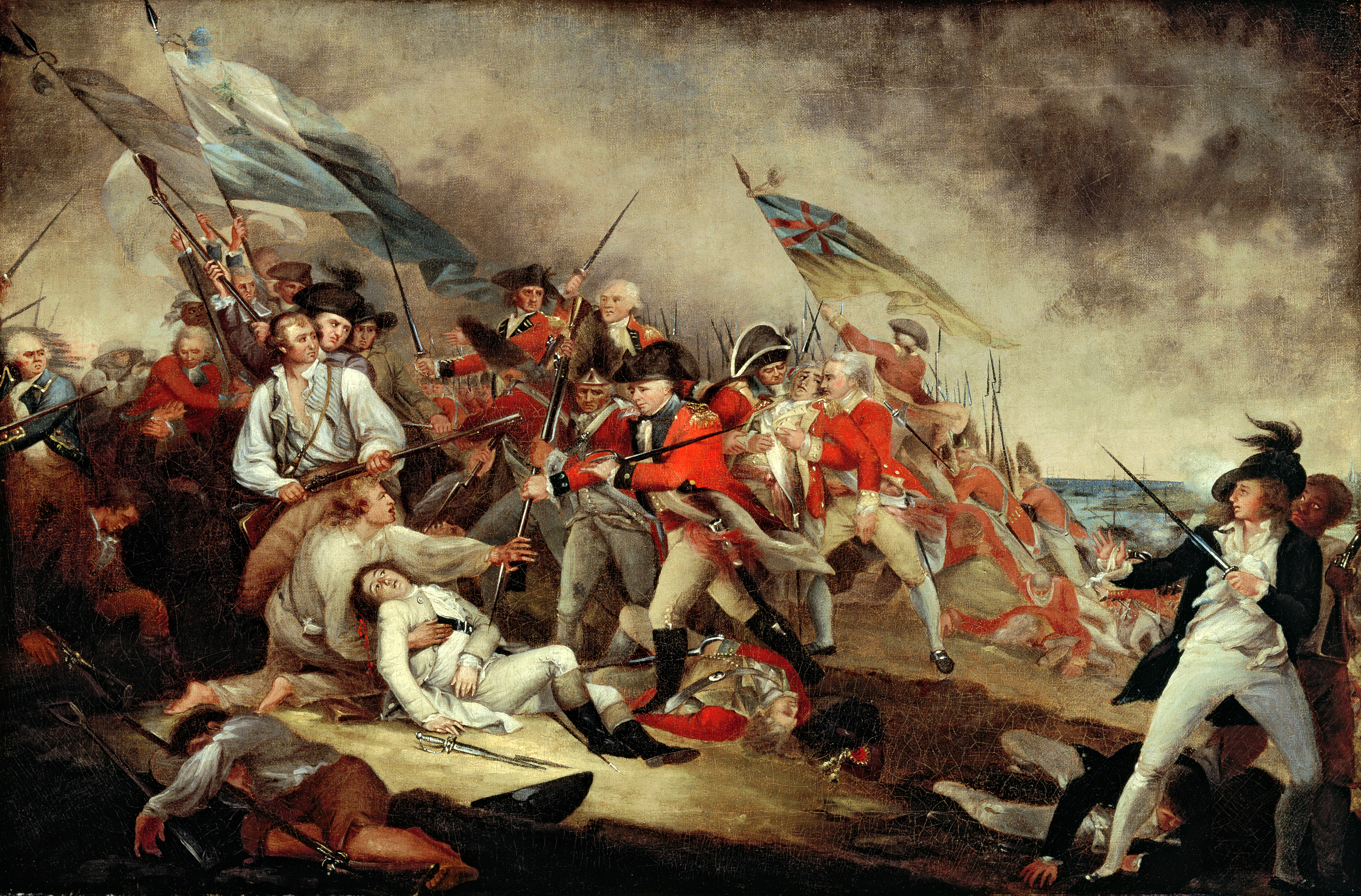
The Death of General Warren at the Battle of Bunker Hill; Rawdon is shown in the background waving the 5th Foot's regimental colour

Rawdon was posted at Boston as a lieutenant in the 5th Regiment of Foot's grenadier company under Captain Francis Marsden. He first saw action at the Battles of Lexington and Concord and the Battle of Bunker Hill. Serving with the grenadiers, he participated in the second assault against Breed's Hill (which failed), and the third assault against the redoubt. His superior, Captain Harris, was wounded beside him. At the age of 21, Lord Rawdon took command of the company for the third and final assault. When the troops of the third assault began to falter, Rawdon stood atop of the American redoubt, waving the British ensign. John Burgoyne noted in dispatches: "Lord Rawdon has this day stamped his fame for life." He also was wounded during the assault. He was promoted captain, and given a company in the 63rd Foot.

Lord Rawdon is depicted in John Trumbull's famous painting, The Death of General Warren at the Battle of Bunker Hill. Rawdon is in the far background holding the 5th Regiment of Foot's regimental colour.

=== Campaigns in the Carolinas and New York, 1775–76 ===
He was appointed aide-de-camp to General Sir Henry Clinton, and sailed with him on the expedition to Brunswick Town, North Carolina, on the Cape Fear River, and then to the repulse at Fort Moultrie, Charleston, South Carolina. He returned with him to New York. On 4 August, he dined with General Clinton, Admiral Lord Howe, Lord Cornwallis, General Vaughan, and others. During the Battle of Long Island, he was at headquarters with Clinton.

On 15 September, Rawdon led his men at Kip's Bay, an amphibious landing on Manhattan island. He participated at the landings at Pell's Point.

=== Rhode Island, England, and New York ===
On 8 December Rawdon landed with Clinton at Rhode Island, securing the ports for the British Navy. On 13 January 1777, with Clinton, he departed for London, arriving on 1 March. During a ball at Lord George Germain's, he met Lafayette, who was visiting London.

Returning to America in July, while Howe went to his Philadelphia campaign, Rawdon went with Clinton to the New York headquarters. He participated in the battles of the New York Highlands, where on 7 October, Fort Constitution (opposite West Point) was captured. However, this was too late to link up with General Burgoyne at Albany.

Rawdon was sent to Philadelphia with dispatches and returned to New York for the winter, where he raised a regiment, called the Volunteers of Ireland, recruited from deserters and Irish Loyalists. Lord Edward Fitzgerald, the future United Irish leader and rebel, served as his aide-de-camp. Promoted colonel in command of this regiment, Rawdon went with Clinton to Philadelphia. starting out on 18 June 1778, he went with Clinton during the withdrawal from Philadelphia to New York, and saw action at the Battle of Monmouth. He was appointed adjutant general. Rawdon was sent to learn news of the Battle of Rhode Island.

In New York, on 3 September 1779, he quarrelled with Clinton, and resigned his position as adjutant general. He served with the Volunteers of Ireland during the raid on Staten Island by Lord Stirling on 15 January 1780.

=== Southern Campaign ===
He went south to the Siege of Charleston with reinforcements. After the city fell to the British, Lord Cornwallis posted him at Camden (16 August 1780) as the British sought to occupy South Carolina. Rawdon commanded the British left wing at the Battle of Camden. When Cornwallis went into Virginia, he left Rawdon in effective command in the South.

Perhaps his most noted achievement was the victory in 1781 at the Battle of Hobkirk's Hill, in which, in command of only a small force, he defeated by superior military skill and determination, a much larger body of Americans. Thinking (in error) that General Nathanael Greene had moved his artillery away, Rawdon attacked Greene's left wing. Rawdon quickly concentrated his entire force on the American left flank, using the military advantage of local superiority, which forced the American line to collapse and abandon the field in disorder.

However, Rawdon was forced to begin a gradual retreat to Charleston. He relieved the Siege of Ninety-Six, evacuating its small garrison and conducting a limited pursuit of American troops. He withdrew his forces to Charleston. In July 1781, in poor health, he gave up his command. On his return to Great Britain, he was captured at sea by François Joseph Paul de Grasse, but was exchanged. After Rawdon's departure, the British evacuated Charleston as the war drew to a close. They took thousands of Loyalists and freed slaves with them, having promised freedom to slaves of rebels who joined their lines, resettling these groups in Nova Scotia and the Caribbean.

== Irish parliamentary patriot ==
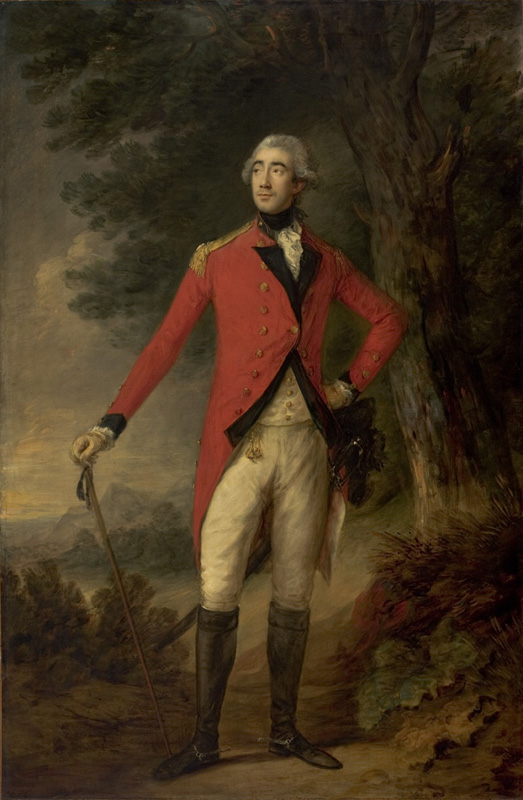
Portrait of Lord Rawdon by Thomas Gainsborough, 1784

Rawdon sat for Randalstown, County Antrim, in the Irish House of Commons from 1781 until 1783. In the Irish Parliament, Rawdon associated on most questions with the Patriot party of Henry Grattan and Lord Charlemont. He succeeded his father as 2nd Earl of Moira on 20 June 1793, and thereafter served first in the Irish House of Lords

In an eve-of-the -Rebellion speech to the Lords on 19 February 1798, he appealed for parliamentary reform: for the abolition of the "pocket boroughs" through which the Lords and the Dublin Castle administration effectively nominated two-thirds of the Irish Commons, and for an amendment to the Oath of Supremacy to allow Catholics (extended the right to vote in 1793 on the same limited and idiosyncratic terms as Protestants) to sit in parliament. In January 1793, he had received the delegates of the Catholic Committee, including as their agent Theobald Wolfe Tone, in London and helped arrange their audience with the king. When rumours followed that Rawdon might replace the Earl of Westmorland as Irish Viceroy, Tone, a United Irishman, approached him in hopes of being appointed his private secretary. In June, Rawdon became godfather to Tone's fourth child, named in his honour Francis Rawdon Tone.

While alarmed by the drift of the United Irishmen, despairing of reform, toward insurrection, Rawdon denounced the government's policy of coercion. To the king he sought to present evidence collated and supplied by the eminent physician Whitley Stokes and the lawyer William Sampson of the atrocities and tortures visited upon country people by Crown forces as they sought to break-up and disarm the movement.

In 1796, Tone was asked by his French hosts whether "we might choose a king" for Ireland (the people of the country being "in general very ignorant"). Tone responded that "Lord Moira" was the only person that might conceivably fill such a role, but that he had "blown his reputation to pieces by accepting a command against France". (Tone's larger objection was that the Presbyterians, who he was in no doubt would "direct the public sentiment in framing a government", were "thoroughly enlightened and sincere republicans").

After the United Irish risings in the summer of 1798, Rawdon opposed the government's plans to abolish the Irish Parliament and effect a legislative union with Great Britain. While Governor General of India, in 1814 Rawdon was to offer further evidence of an Irish attachment. He headed the list of subscribers in Bengal to the Irish Harp Society formed in Belfast "to revive the Ancient Music of Ireland" by veterans of the patriotic and reform politics of the 1780s and '90s, among them several former United Irishmen.

Prior to leaving for India, in 1812 Rawdon had also used his offices to secure a position—registrar of the Admiralty Prize Court in Bermuda—for Thomas Moore, the Irish patriotic bard and admirer of the leading United Irishmen. Moore hailed as "the ultimi Romanorum of our country" both Lord Edward Fitzgerald and Tone whom Rawson himself described as "The Irish Lafayette".

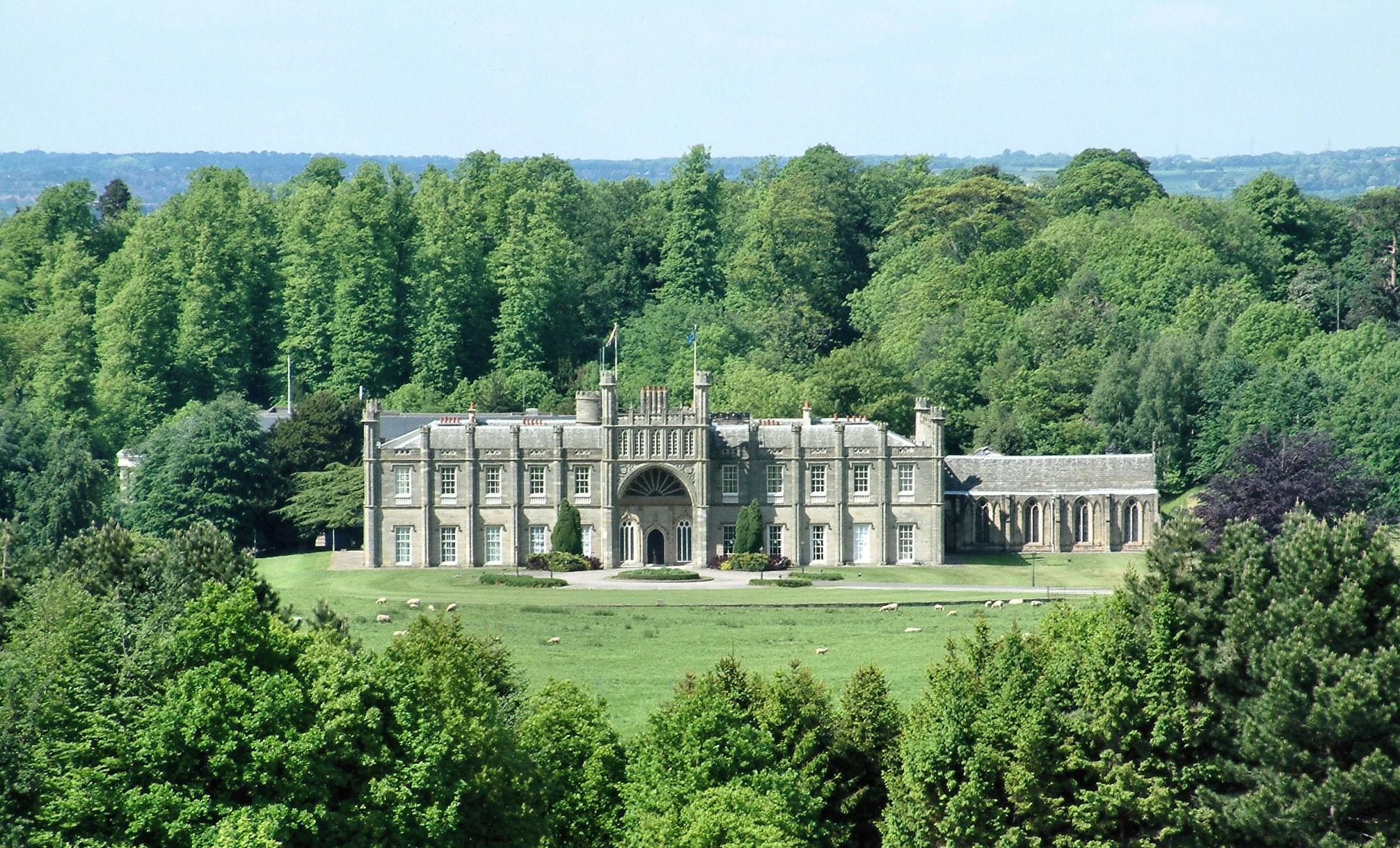
Donington Hall

== British Peer and prime-ministerial candidate ==
=== Lord Hastings ===
After his return from America, Rawdon had been honoured by the king. In March 1783, he was created Baron Rawdon, of Rawdon, in the County of York. In 1787, he became friends with the Prince of Wales, and loaned him many thousands of pounds. In 1788 he became embroiled in the Regency Crisis. In 1789 his mother succeeded to the barony of Hastings, and Rawdon, an in accordance to his uncle's will, added the surname of Hastings to his own. From 1801, as Lord Hastings he sat in the House of Lords.

Inheriting Donington Hall in Leicestershire from his uncle, Rawdon rebuilt it in 1790–93 in the Gothic style; the architect was William Wilkins the Elder. It is now a Grade II* listed building. He placed the estate at the disposal of the Bourbon Princes upon their exile in England following the French Revolution. He is said to have left a signed chequebook in each bedroom for the occupant to use at pleasure. Rawdon became active in associations in London. He was elected a Fellow of the Royal Society in 1787 and Fellow of the Society of Antiquaries of London in 1793. For 1806–08 he was Grand Master of the Free Masons. In May 1789 he acted as the Duke of York's second in his duel with Lieut.-Colonel Lennox on Wimbledon Common.

Following the declaration of war in 1793 of France upon Great Britain, Rawdon was appointed major general, on 12 October 1793. Sent by the Pitt ministry, Rawdon launched an expedition into Ostend, France, in 1794. He marched to join with the army of the Duke of York, at Alost. The French general Pichegru, with superior numbers, forced the British back toward their base at Antwerp. Rawdon left the expedition, feeling Pitt had broken promises.

=== Candidature for Prime Minister ===
In 1797 it was rumoured briefly that Rawdon would replace Pitt as Prime Minister. There was some discontent with Pitt over his policies regarding the war with France. Additionally, Pitt's long tenure in office had given him ample opportunity to annoy various political grandees, including but not limited to The Duke of Leeds and Lords Thurlow and Lansdowne. In mid-May, a combination of these various figures, coupled with a handful of Members of Parliament, proposed to make Rawdon the Prime Minister. Having fought in the American War and having led an expedition to Quiberon, he commanded widespread respect. His relationship with the Prince of Wales also established him as a potential rival to Pitt, who was supported strongly by George III.

The prime motivation for the plan of having Rawdon become Prime Minister was to secure peace with France, the plotters had come to believe (somewhat unfairly) that Pitt was an obstacle to this objective. But their plan collapsed barely a month later in mid-June because of a lack of support from the political establishment. Additionally, when Rawdon wrote to the King to propose the change of chief ministers, the monarch ignored him. Thus the proposal came to nothing. He became Commander-in-Chief, Scotland with the rank of full general in September 1803. In this capacity he rented the huge Duddingston House, south of Edinburgh.

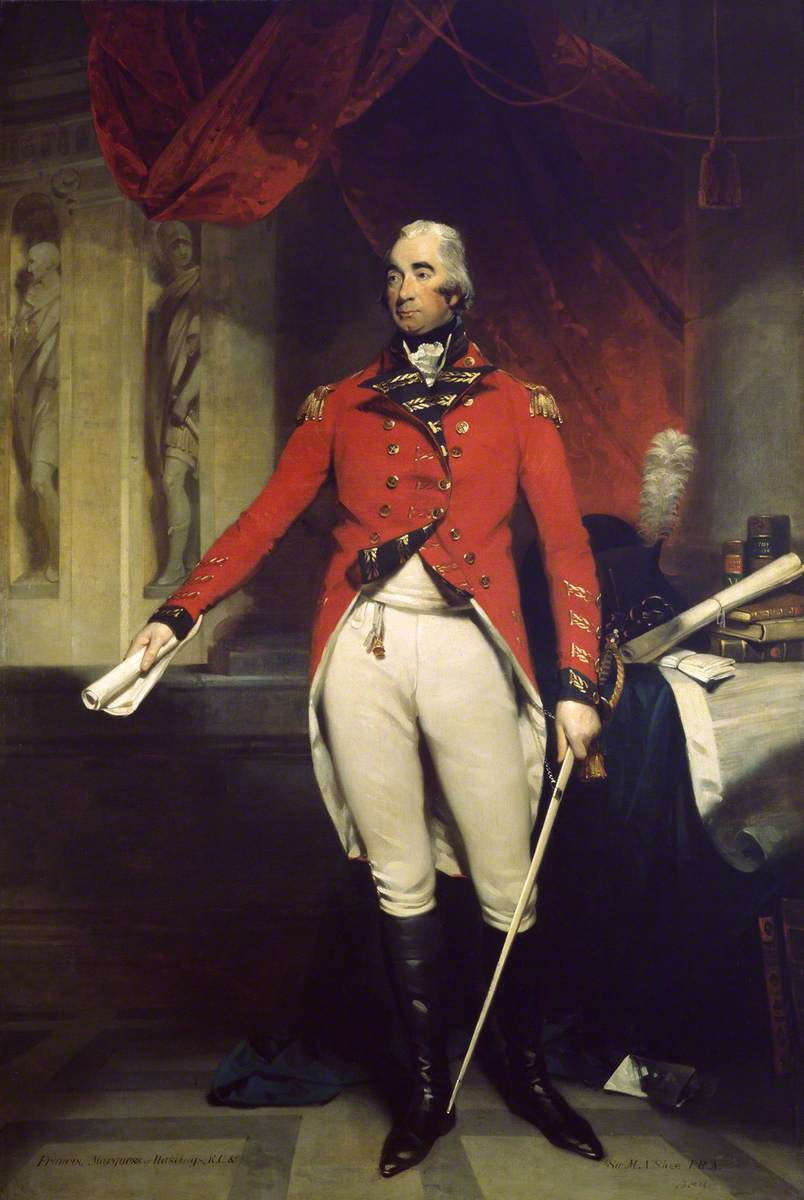
1803 portrait of Rawdon by Martin Archer Shee

Becoming a Whig in politics, Rawdon entered government in 1806 as part of the Ministry of All the Talents as Master-General of the Ordnance, which enabled him to carry a philanthropic measure, which he had promoted since his first entry into the House of Lords, the Debtor and Creditor Bill for relief of poor debtors. However, he resigned his post on the fall of the ministry the next year. He was also Constable of the Tower (of London) from 1806 to his death. During a debate in the House of Lords on 5 February 1807 over the proposed Slave Trade Act 1807, which would abolish British involvement in the Atlantic slave trade, he publicly supported the bill and stated that "the evidence upon the table of the house must be sufficient to convince their lordships of the necessity of abolishing this sanguinary traffic. If noble lords were not satisfied with this evidence, he referred them to Holy Writ, he referred them to that great work of our forefathers the Old Testament, and that great Commentator upon that work, whose maxim was, "Do unto others as you would they should do unto you."

Being a close associate of the Prince Regent, Moira was asked by him to form a Whig government after the assassination of Spencer Perceval in 1812 ended that ministry. Moira's attempts to create a governing coalition failed, but as a mark of the prince's respect, he was appointed to the Order of the Garter in that year. The Tories returned to power under the Earl of Liverpool. On 6 December 1816, after the conclusion of the Anglo-Nepalese War (see below), Moira was raised to the rank of Marquess of Hastings together with the subsidiary titles Viscount Loudoun and Earl of Rawdon.

== Governor-General of Fort William ==
=== Appointment ===
Through the influence of the Prince-Regent, Moira was appointed Governor-General of the Presidency of Fort William, effectively the Governor-General of India, on 11 November 1812. His tenure as Governor-General was a memorable one, overseeing the victory in the Gurkha War (1814–1816); the final conquest of the Marathas in 1818; and the purchase of the island of Singapore in 1819.

=== Military policy ===
After delays clearing his affairs, he reached Madras on 11 September 1813. In October, he settled in at Calcutta and assumed office. British India then consisted of Madras, Bengal, and Bombay. He commanded an army of 15,000 British regulars, a Bengal army of 27 regiments of native infantry, and eight regiments of cavalry; a Madras army, led by General John Abercrombie of 24 regiments of native infantry, and eight regiments of native cavalry.

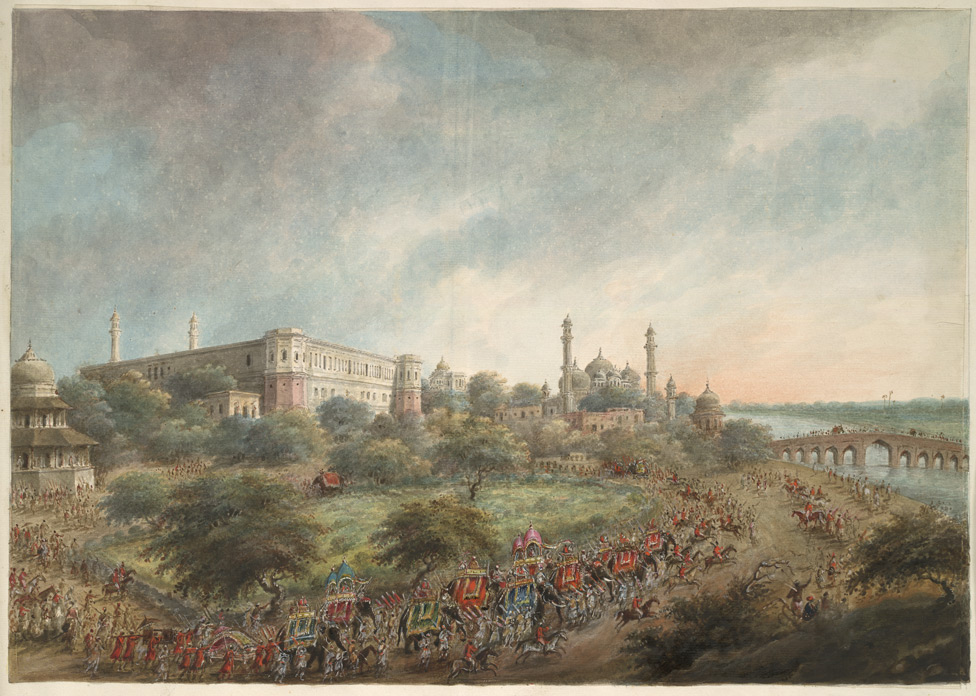
Lord Hastings' party entering the city of Lucknow on elephant back in 1814

Hastings employed Sita Ram, a Bengal draftsman to record his 1814-15 (seventeen month) inspection of British possessions. Resulting in over 230 watercolours of locations in India.

==== Anglo-Nepalese War ====
In May 1813, the British declared war against the Gurkhas of Nepal. Hastings sent four divisions in separate attacks led by General Bennet Marley with 8,000 men against Kathmandu, General John Sullivan Wood with 4,000 men against Butwal, General Sir David Ochterlony with 10,000 men against Amar Singh Thapa, and General Robert Rollo Gillespie, with 3,500 men against Nahan, Srinagar, and Garhwal. Only Ochterlony had some success; Gillespie was killed. After inconclusive negotiations, Hastings reinforced Ochterlony to 20,000 men, who then won the battle of Makwanpur on 28 February. The Gurkhas then sued for peace, under the Sugauli Treaty.

==== Third Anglo-Maratha War ====
After raids by Pindaris in January 1817, Hastings led a force at Hindustan in the North; in the South, the Army of the Deccan, under the command of General Sir Thomas Hislop. The Peshwa was defeated by William Fullarton Elphinstone on the Poona. Appa Sahib was defeated at the battle of Nagpur. Hislop defeated Holkar at the Battle of Mahidpur. These events effectively established the supremacy of British power in India.

=== Diplomacy ===
Rawdon was active diplomatically, protecting weaker Indian states. His domestic policy in India was also largely successful, seeing the repair of the Mughul canal system in Delhi in 1820, as well as educational and administrative reforms, and encouraging press freedom. He confirmed the purchase of Singapore from the Sultan of Jahore, by Sir Stamford Raffles, in January 1819.

His last years of office were embittered by a then-notorious matter, the affairs of the W. Palmer and Company banking house. The whole affair was mixed up with insinuations against Lord Hastings, especially charging him with having shown favouritism towards one of the partners in the firm. He was later exonerated but the experience embittered him.

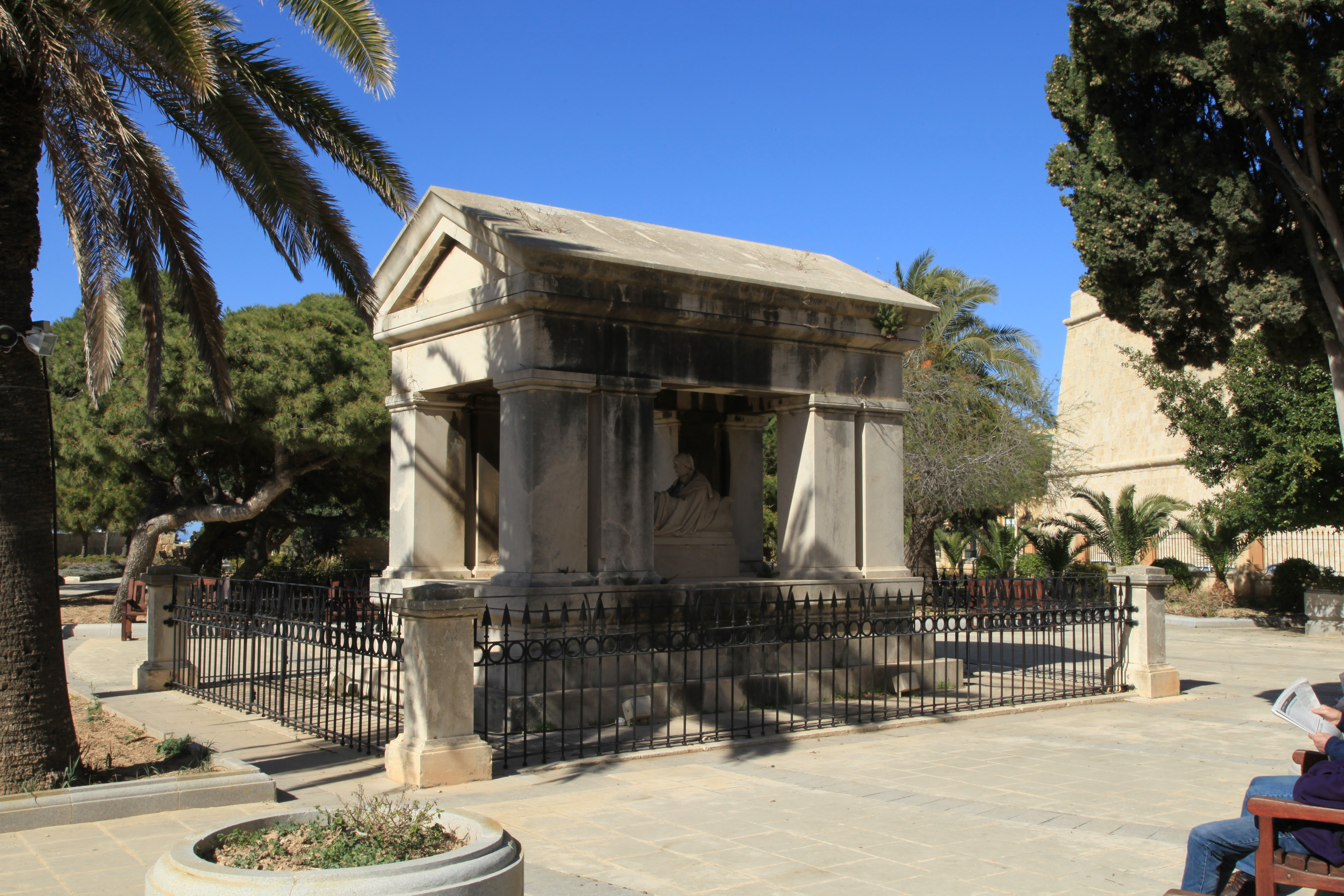
Tomb of Lord Hastings in Hastings Gardens, Valletta

He also became increasingly estranged from the East India Company's Board of Control (see Company rule in India). He resigned in 1821 but did not leave India until early 1823.

== Death ==
Rawdon was appointed Governor of Malta in 1824 but died at sea off Naples two years later aboard HMS Revenge, while attempting to return home with his wife. She returned his body to Malta, and following his earlier directions, cut off his right hand and preserved it, to be buried with her when she died. His body was then laid to rest in a large marble sarcophagus in Hastings Gardens, Valletta. His hand was eventually interred, clasped with hers, in the family vault at Loudoun Kirk.

== Legacy ==
- He was awarded the freedom of the city of Dublin in recognition of his service in America.
- Loyalists whom he rescued during the siege of Ninety-Six were resettled by the Crown and granted land in Nova Scotia. They named their township Rawdon in his honour.
- Hastings County, Ontario, and three of its early townships were named after him, by Loyalists who were resettled in Upper Canada after the American War of Independence.
- HMS Moira was named in his honour in 1805, as was the Moira River in Ontario, Canada.
- Francis Rawdon Moira Crozier (1796–c.1848), an Irish Royal Navy officer and polar explorer, was named for him; Lord Moira (as he was at the time) was a friend of Crozier's family.
- The Hastings River in New South Wales is named after him, as is Rawdon Island, within the River. The township of Huntingdon in the Hastings Valley is also associated with him.

== Marriage and issue ==
On 12 July 1804, at the age of 50, Hastings married Flora Campbell, 6th Countess of Loudoun, daughter of Major-General James Mure-Campbell, 5th Earl of Loudoun and Lady Flora Macleod. They had six children:

- Lady Flora Elizabeth (11 February 1806 – 5 July 1839), lady in waiting to Queen Victoria's mother, the Duchess of Kent, died unmarried.
- Hon. Francis George Augustus (13 February 1807 – 14 February 1807), died in infancy.
- George Augustus Francis Rawdon-Hastings, 2nd Marquess of Hastings (4 February 1808 – 13 January 1844)
- Lady Sophia Frederica Christina (1 February 1809 – 28 December 1859), married John Crichton-Stuart, 2nd Marquess of Bute, mother of John Crichton-Stuart, 3rd Marquess of Bute.
- Lady Selina Constance (15 April 1810 – 8 November 1867), married Charles Henry and had children.
- Lady Adelaide Augusta Lavinia (25 February 1812 – 6 December 1860), married Sir William Murray, 7th Baronet of Octertyre.

Through his brother, the Hon. John Theophilus Rawdon, he was uncle to Elizabeth, Lady William Russell.

== In popular culture ==
- The character of Rawdon Crawley in William Makepeace Thackeray's 1847–1848 novel Vanity Fair is named after him.
- He appears as Francis Rawdon Hastings, the Second Earl of Moira, in Stephanie Barron's 2006 novel Jane and the Barque of Frailty.

== Portraits ==
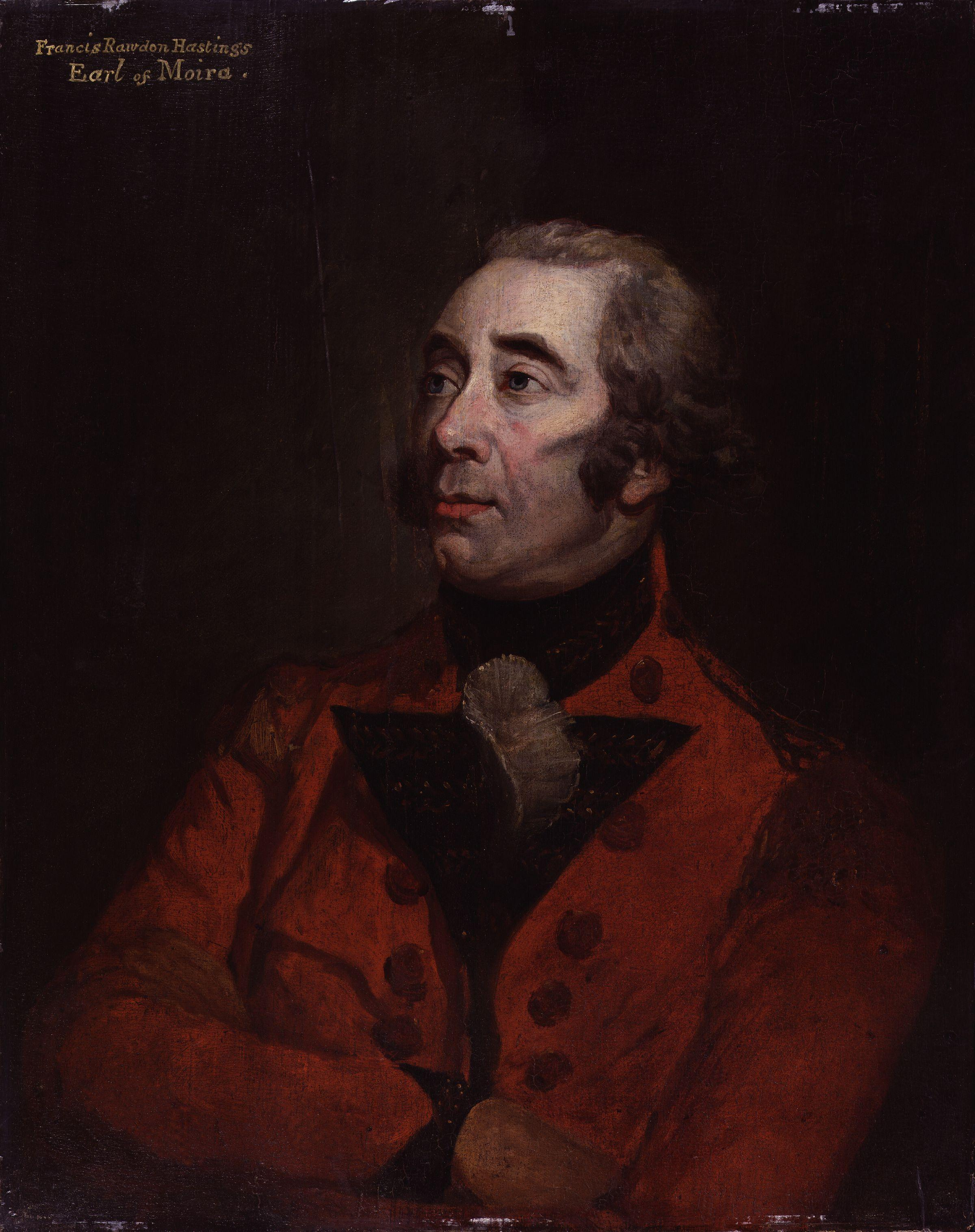
Marquess of Hastings by Hugh Douglas Hamilton (c. 1801)

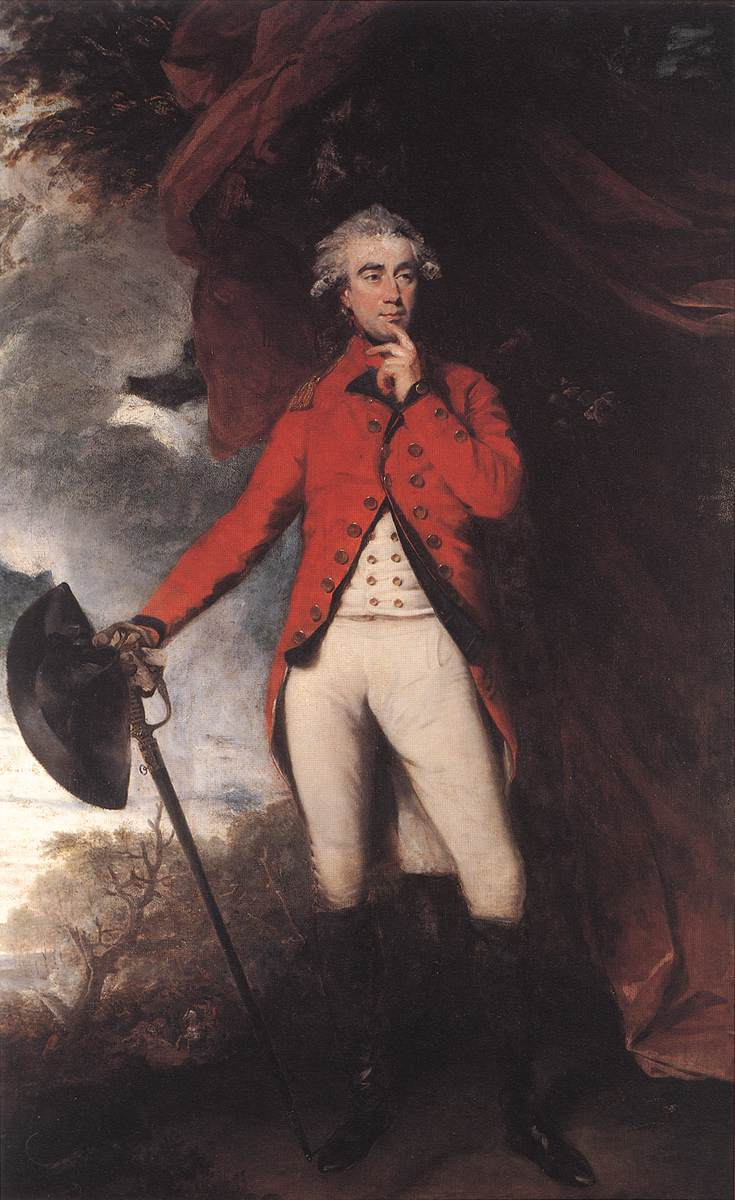
Marquess of Hastings, Governor-General of India by Joshua Reynolds (c. 1812)

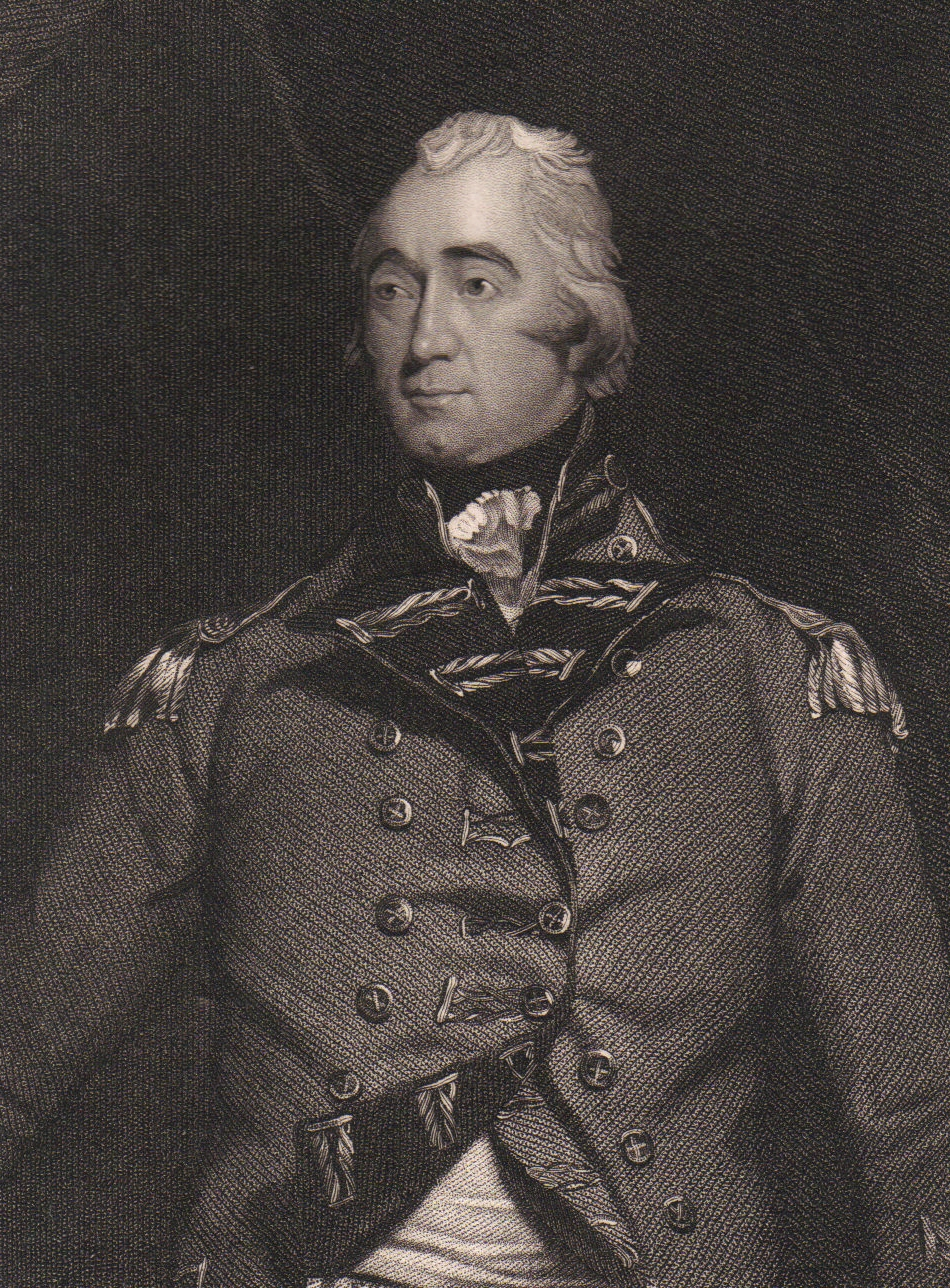
Francis Rawdon, Marquess of Hastings. Engraving. Fisher, Son & Co, London. 1829

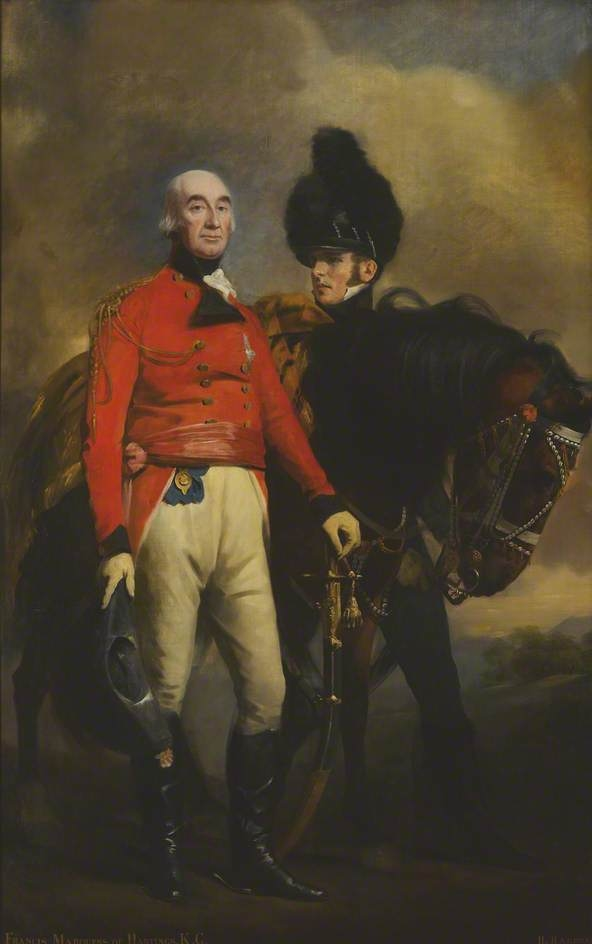
Francis Rawdon, Marquess of Hastings by Henry Raeburn. 1813

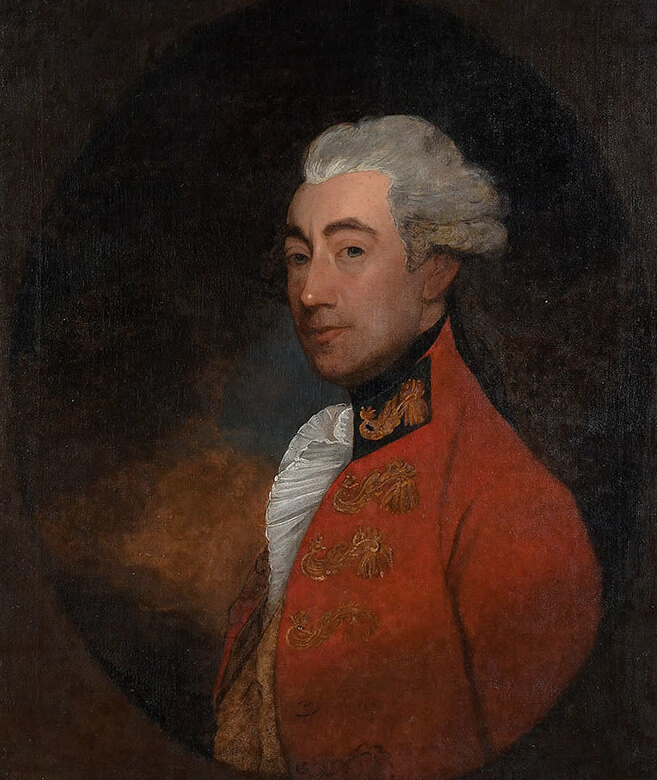
portrait by Gilbert Stuart, c. 1796

== Sources ==
- "Hastings, Francis Rawdon". Oxford Dictionary of National Biography (online ed.). Oxford University Press. doi:10.1093/ref:odnb/12568. (Subscription, Wikipedia Library access or UK public library membership required.)
- Paul David Nelson (2005). Francis Rawdon-Hastings, Marquess of Hastings: Soldier, Peer of the Realm, Governor-General of India. Fairleigh Dickinson University Press. ISBN 978-0-8386-4071-5.
- Beevor, R. J. (1931). Hastings of Hastings. Printed for Private Circulation.
- Harrington, Jack (2010). Sir John Malcolm and the Creation of British India. New York: Palgrave Macmillan. ISBN 978-0-230-10885-1.
- Kelly, Ronan (2009). Bard of Erin: The Life of Thomas Moore. Penguin Books.
- Morley, Vincent (2002). Irish opinion and the American Revolution, 1760–83. Cambridge University Press.

Parliament of Ireland
Preceded by John O'Neill; James St John Jeffereyes	Member of Parliament for Randalstown –1783; With: John O'Neill	Succeeded by John O'Neill; Richard Jackson
Military offices
Preceded by Sir Ralph Abercromby	Commander-in-Chief, Scotland; 1803–1806	Succeeded by William Cathcart, 1st Viscount Cathcart
Preceded by Sir George Nugent	Commander-in-Chief, India; 1813–1823	Succeeded by Sir Edward Paget
Preceded by Eyre Massey, 1st Baron Clarina	Colonel of the 27th Regiment of Foot; 1804–1826	Succeeded by Hon. Sir Galbraith Lowry Cole
Political offices
Preceded by The Earl of Chatham	Master-General of the Ordnance; 1806–1807	Succeeded by The Earl of Chatham
Government offices
Preceded by The Lord Minto	Governor-General of India; 1813–1823	Succeeded by John Adam (acting)
Preceded by Hon. Thomas Maitland	Governor of Malta; 1824–1826	Succeeded by Alexander George Woodford (acting)
Honorary titles
Preceded by The Marquess Cornwallis	Constable of the Tower; Lord Lieutenant of the Tower Hamlets; 1806–1826	Succeeded by The Duke of Wellington
Masonic offices
Preceded by The Duke of Cumberland and Strathearn (as Grand Master)	Acting Grand Master of the Premier Grand Lodge of England; 1790–1812	Succeeded by The Duke of Sussex (as Grand Master)
Preceded by The Earl of Dalhousie (as Grand Master)	Acting Grand Master of the Grand Lodge of Scotland; 1806–1808	Succeeded by Hon. William Maule
Peerage of the United Kingdom
New creation	Marquess of Hastings; 1816–1826	Succeeded by George Rawdon-Hastings
Peerage of Great Britain
Preceded by John Rawdon	Earl of Moira; 1793–1826	Succeeded by George Rawdon-Hastings
New creation	Baron Rawdon; 1783–1826	Succeeded by George Rawdon-Hastings
Peerage of England
Preceded by Elizabeth Rawdon	Baron Hastings; 1808–1826	Succeeded by George Rawdon-Hastings
