= Huntington, Maryland =

Huntington may refer to:

- Huntingtown, Maryland
- Huntington, Maryland, former name of Bowie, Maryland
