= Huntington Township =

Huntington Township is the name of several townships in the United States:

- Huntington Township, Huntington County, Indiana
- Huntington, New York
- Huntington Township, Brown County, Ohio
- Huntington Township, Gallia County, Ohio
- Huntington Township, Lorain County, Ohio
- Huntington Township, Ross County, Ohio
- Huntington Township, Adams County, Pennsylvania
- Huntington Township, Luzerne County, Pennsylvania
