= Selina Hastings, Countess of Huntingdon =

British countess and Methodist leader (1707–1791)

The Right Honourable The Countess of Huntingdon
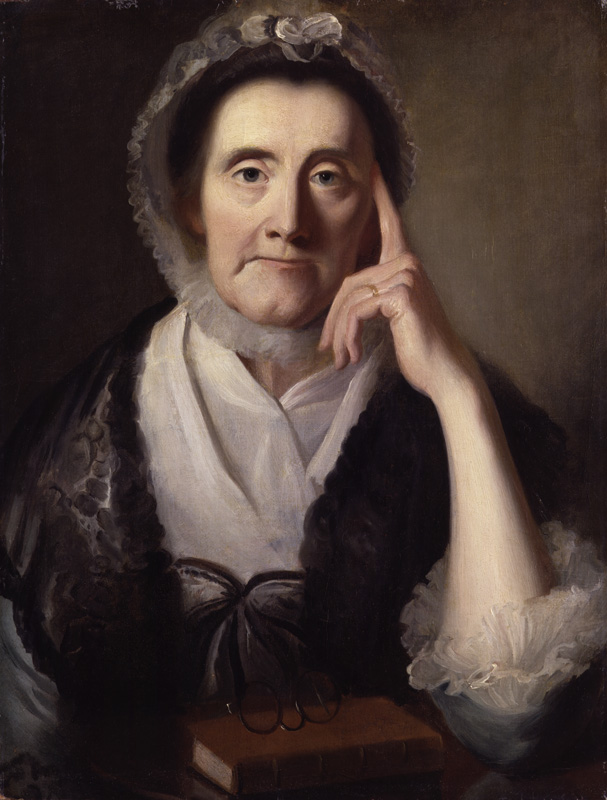
- c. 1770
- Known for: Methodism
- Born: Selina Shirley; 24 August 1707; Astwell Castle, Northamptonshire, England
- Died: 17 June 1791 (aged 83)
- Spouse: Theophilus Hastings, 9th Earl of Huntingdon (m. 1728; died 1746)
- Issue: Francis Hastings, 10th Earl of Huntingdon; Elizabeth Rawdon, Countess of Moira; Lady Selina Hastings
- Father: Washington Shirley, 2nd Earl Ferrers
- Mother: Mary Levinge

Selina Hastings, Countess of Huntingdon (née Shirley; 24 August 1707 – 17 June 1791) was an English Methodist leader who played a prominent part in the religious revival of the 18th century and the Methodist movement in England and Wales. She founded an evangelical branch in England and Sierra Leone, known as the Countess of Huntingdon's Connexion.

She helped finance and guide early Methodism and was the first principal of Trevecca College, Wales, established in 1768 to train Methodist ministers. With the construction of 64 chapels in England and Wales, plus mission work in colonial America, she is estimated to have spent over £100,000 on these activities, a huge sum when a family of four could live on £31 per year.

A regular correspondent of George Whitefield and John Wesley, she is also remembered for her adversarial relationships with other Methodists.

== Personal life ==
Selina Shirley was born in August 1707 at Astwell Castle, Northamptonshire, second daughter of Washington Shirley, 2nd Earl Ferrers, and Mary Levinge, daughter of Sir Richard Levinge, 1st Baronet. The family moved to Staunton Harold Hall, in Leicestershire when she was 17 and in 1728, she married Theophilus Hastings, 9th Earl of Huntingdon, who lived at nearby Donington Hall. This was arranged by his elder half-sister, Lady Elizabeth Hastings, a well-known religious philanthropist and supporter of women's education.

She gave birth to seven children in the first ten years of the marriage, four of whom died young; her husband died in 1746, while she allegedly suffered from poor health. The family were interested in politics, religion and the arts, and commissioned portraits from fashionable artists of the day.

== Foundling Hospital ==
On 21 April 1730, she became one of the 21 aristocratic women whose support Thomas Coram would enlist in his efforts to establish the Foundling Hospital. Securing the support of notably pious women such as Lady Huntingdon as signatories to the Ladies' Petition for the Establishment of the Foundling Hospital lent his endeavour not only respectability but cachet; many of the women were lending their signature where their husbands had previously refused, making the Foundling Hospital 'one of the most fashionable charities of the day.' Selina would later provide the Coram with 'financial support for fees, stamp duties, vellum, seals and others expenses [sic] connected with the presentation of the Foundling Hospital Charter for the King's signature.'

The petition was presented to King George II in 1735.

== Religious revival ==
In 1739, Lady Huntingdon joined the first Methodist society in Fetter Lane, London. Sometime after the death of her husband in 1746, she threw in her lot with John Wesley and George Whitefield in the work of the great revival. According to Schlenther, it was Wesley who first attracted her to Methodism, noting a visit to his chapel in Donnington (Wood) in East Shropshire, in which a rare exception to egalitarian principles was made and she was offered a private pew. Whitefield became her personal chaplain, and, with his assistance, following problems put in her path by the Anglican clergy from whom she had preferred not to separate, she founded the "Countess of Huntingdon's Connexion", a Calvinistic movement within the Methodist church.

In the earlier part of her life Isaac Watts, Mary, Lady Abney, Philip Doddridge, and Augustus Montague Toplady were among her friends. Lady Anne Erskine (eldest daughter of the 10th Earl of Buchan), was her closest friend and companion for many years in the latter part of Lady Huntingdon's life.

== Chapel building ==
In 1748, the Countess gave Whitefield a scarf as her chaplain, and in that capacity, he preached in one of her London houses, in Park Street, Westminster, to audiences that included Chesterfield, Walpole and Bolingbroke. She held large dinner parties at which Whitefield preached to the gathered dignitaries after they had eaten.

Moved to further the religious revival in a Calvinistic manner compatible with Whitefield's work, she was responsible for founding 64 chapels and contributed to the funding of others, insisting they should all subscribe to the doctrines of the Church of England and use only the Book of Common Prayer. Amongst these were chapels at Brighton (1761), Bath (1765), Worcester (c. 1766), Tunbridge Wells (1769), several in Wales, and a small number in London including founding one adjacent to her London home at Spa Fields, Clerkenwell/Finsbury (which resulted in a case being brought before the ecclesiastical courts by the vicar of the parish church of St James). She partly funded the independent Surrey Chapel, Southwark of Rowland Hill. She appointed ministers to officiate in them, under the impression that as a peeress she had a right to employ as many chaplains as she pleased. In her chapel at Bath (now owned by the Bath Preservation Trust and housing the Building of Bath Collection which is open to the public), there was a curtained recess dubbed "Nicodemus' Corner" where bishops sat incognito to hear services.

== Trevecca College and later history ==
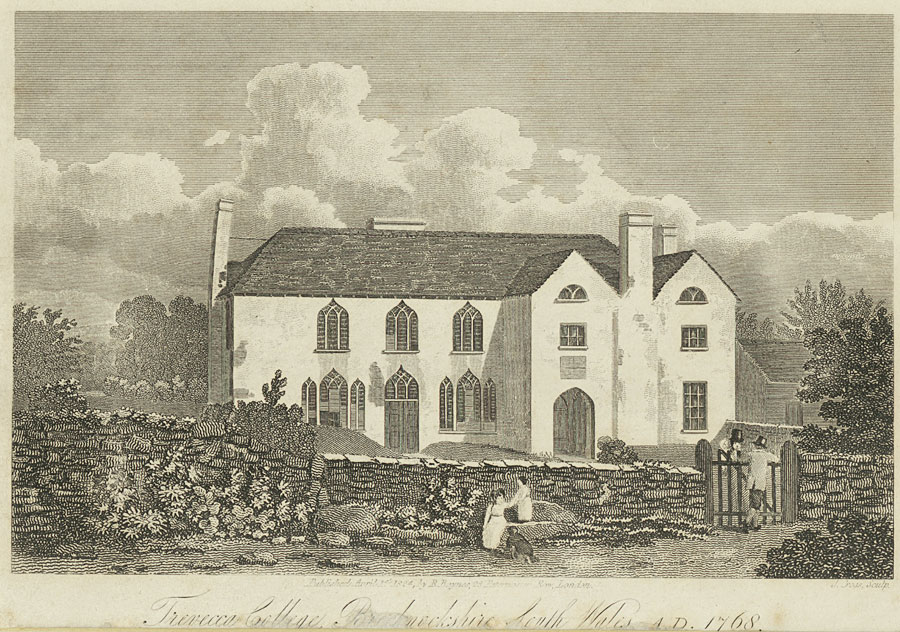
Trevecca College, Brecknockshire, depicted in 1824

Following the expulsion of six Methodist students from St Edmund Hall, Oxford in 1768 the Countess founded a ministers' training college at Trefeca (Trevecca) near Talgarth, in Mid Wales, not far from Brecon. George Whitefield preached at the opening ceremony. The college moved to Hertfordshire in 1792, and was renamed Cheshunt College. It moved to Cambridge in 1906. Cheshunt College, Cambridge merged with Westminster College, Cambridge, the training college of the Presbyterian Church of England (and after 1972, of the United Reformed Church), in 1967.

In 1842, the Presbyterian Church of Wales opened a college at Trefeca which is approximately a quarter of a mile south of the site of the Countess's college (which is now a farmhouse).

== Foreign missions ==
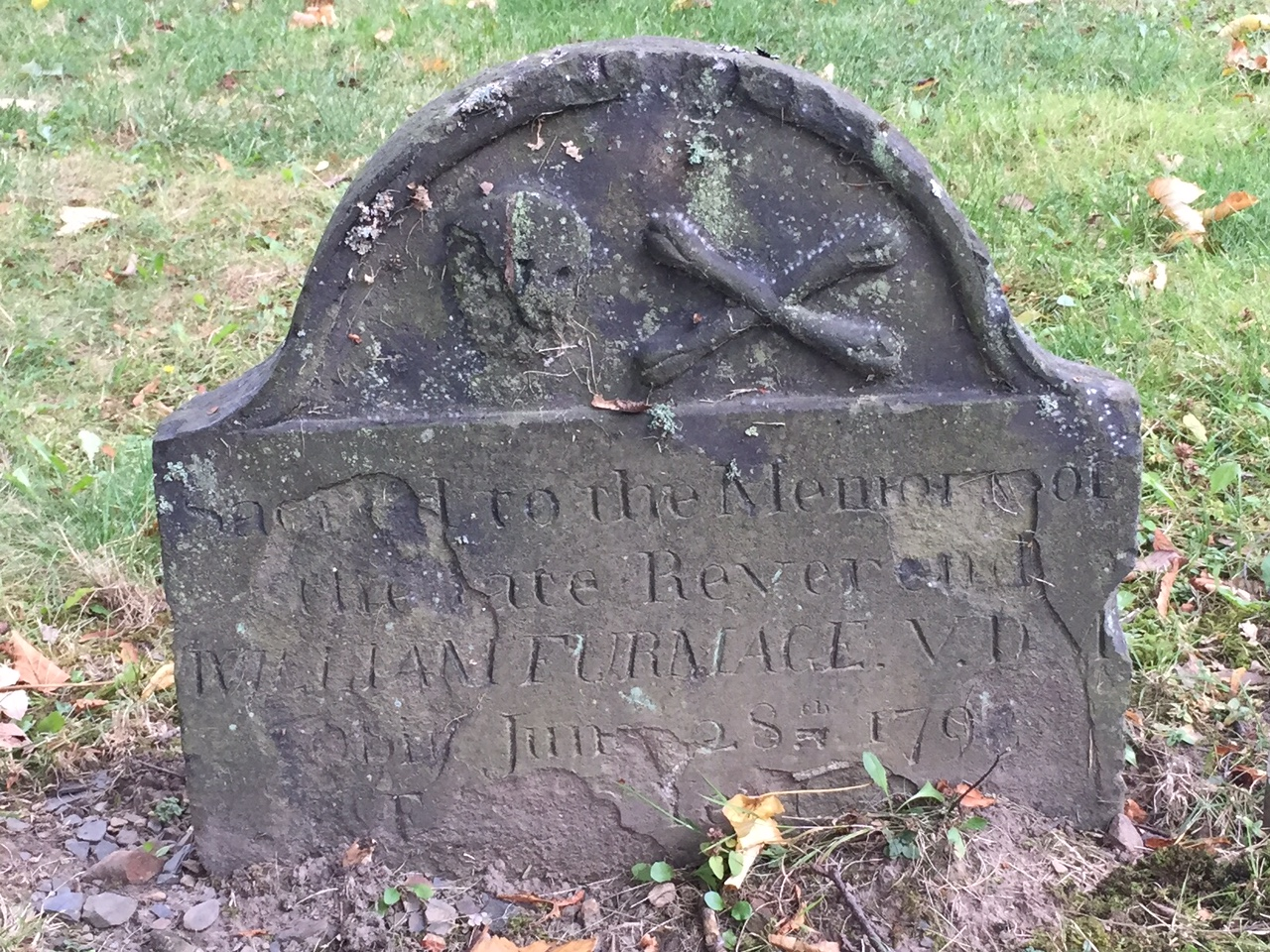
Gravestone of Reverend William Furmage, Old Burying Ground (Halifax, Nova Scotia), Huntingdonian Missionary to the Black Loyalists; he established Black school in Halifax

The Countess had an interest in the Thirteen Colonies, and issues related to Native Americans and enslaved Africans there. During the mid-1760s, she met and befriended Mohegan preacher Samson Occom, then on a tour of England to raise funds for Indian missions in the colonies.

She became a slave owner herself in 1770 when she inherited Whitefield's overseas estates in Georgia and South Carolina, including the Bethesda Home for Boys. On Whitefield's advice, she bought additional slaves for the orphanage's benefit.

The Countess promoted the writings and freedom of formerly enslaved Africans who espoused religious views compatible with her own. For instance, she supported publication of memoirs, or slave narratives, by Ukawsaw Gronniosaw and Olaudah Equiano.

She also used her influence in the world of the arts to secure publication for Phillis Wheatley's 1773 volume of poems, Poems on Various Subjects, Religious and Moral by Phillis Wheatley, Negro Servant to Mr. John Wheatley, of Boston, in New England, which was dedicated to the Countess. Because the Countess was ill when Wheatley visited London, the two women never met. Several pieces of their correspondence are extant.

Until 1779, Lady Huntingdon and her chaplains were members of the Church of England, with which most Methodists were still connected. That year the consistorial court prohibited her chaplains from preaching in the Pantheon in Spa Fields, Clerkenwell, which had been rented by the Countess. To evade the injunction, she was compelled to take shelter under the Toleration Act. This placed her among classified dissenters. Such prominent members as William Romaine and Henry Venn did not want to be classified in that status, and left the Connexion.

After the Patriot victory in the American War of Independence, the Crown fulfilled promises to enslaved Africans and African Americans who had fled their American masters to join the British. The British evacuated thousands of former slaves from the colonies, who became known as Black Loyalists. About 3,000 were resettled in Nova Scotia and New Brunswick, where they were to be given land and supplies. The Countess sent missionaries to these colonies, including John Marrant and William Furmage, to attend to the Black Loyalists.

== Legacy ==
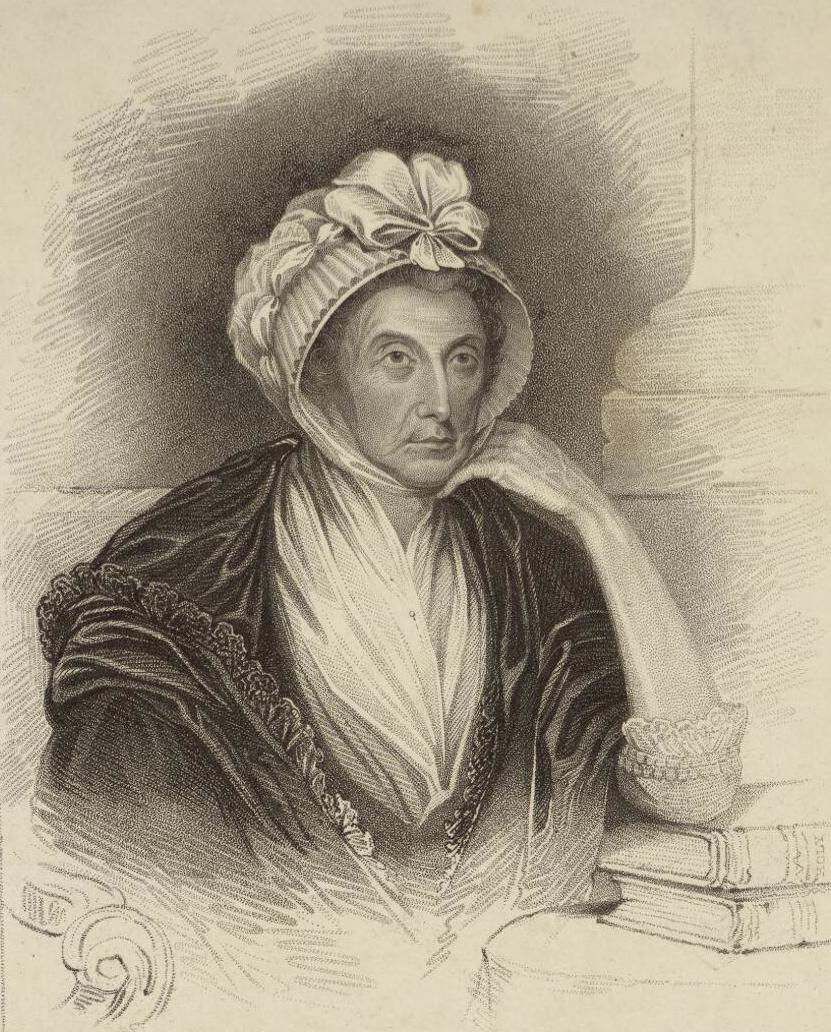
Selina, Countess of Huntingdon in old age

Until her death in London, Lady Huntingdon exercised an active, and even autocratic, superintendence over her chapels and chaplains. Alice Membury, appointed schoolmistress in Melbourne, Derbyshire by Lady Elizabeth Hastings, was ejected by the Countess for 'not turning Methodist'. Selina successfully petitioned George III about the gaiety of Archbishop Cornwallis' establishment, and made a vigorous protest against the anti-Calvinistic minutes of the Wesleyan Conference of 1770, and against relaxing the terms of subscription of 1772.

On the Countess's death in 1791, the 64 chapels and the college were bequeathed to four trustees. Amongst them were Dr Ford, as well as Lady Ann, who was requested to occupy and reside in Lady Huntingdon's house adjoining Spa Fields Chapel, and carry on all needful correspondence (which was immense). She did this dutifully until her own death in 1804 and burial at Bunhill Fields.

The principal trustee was the Reverend Thomas Haweis, who presided at the Convocation of the Connexion, comprising about 120 chapels. As rector of the Church of England parish at Aldwincle until his death in 1820, he ensured the Connexion kept as close to the Church of England as was possible; many chapels became part of the Free Church of England in 1863.

One of the earliest changes under the new trustees was to complete plans to relocate the college. In 1792 it was removed to Cheshunt, Hertfordshire where it remained as Cheshunt College, until 1905, when its functions were transferred to Cambridge University. The college was noted for the number of men it sent to foreign missions.

In 1795, Spa Fields Chapel was used by the founders of the non-denominational Missionary Society, which became the London Missionary Society, for preachers contributing to this, its founding meeting. After her death, much of her movement merged with the Congregationalist Church, who came to predominate in the London Missionary Society, and more joined the Free Church of England in 1863, although in 2022 there were still 22 Connexion congregations functioning in England, with others in Sierra Leone.

In her will, she requested no biography of her should be written and none was attempted until 90 years after her death. Obituaries and tributes were written: Horace Walpole described her as "the patriarchess of the Methodists", while the Roman Catholic Cardinal John Henry Newman commented, "She devoted herself, her means, her time, her thoughts, to the cause of Christ. She did not spend her money on herself; she did not allow the homage paid to her rank to remain with herself".

Huntingdon College, in Montgomery, Alabama, is a coeducation liberal arts college named after the Countess of Huntingdon to honour her contributions to Methodism.

Huntingdon Street in Savannah, Georgia, is likewise named after her in recognition of her association with Whitefield and John and Charles Wesley in their apostolic works in the Colony of Georgia.

Lady Huntingdon Lane is at the Givens Estates in Asheville, North Carolina, a retirement community affiliated with the United Methodist Church.

Lady Huntingdon Road is on the grounds of the United Methodist Assembly, Lake Junaluska, NC, located near the World Methodist Center.

Huntingdon, Pennsylvania is the county seat of Huntingdon County, Pennsylvania (founded September 20, 1787), both of which are named for her.

== Family ==
By her marriage to Theophilus Hastings, 9th Earl of Huntingdon, she had seven children. Of those, three died in childhood and the death date of a fourth is unknown. Her longest surviving children were:

- Francis, Lord Hastings (1729–1789), later 10th Earl of Huntingdon, died unmarried and without issue.
- Lady Elizabeth Hastings (1731–1808), Baroness Hastings, the only child to survive her mother, married John Rawdon, 1st Earl of Moira.
- Lady Selina Hastings (1737–1763), died when engaged to Lt-Col George Hastings, without issue.

== See also ==
- Methodist Church of Great Britain
- Countess of Huntingdon's Connexion

== Sources ==
- Cook, Faith, 2002. Selina: Countess of Huntingdon. Banner of Truth Trust, ISBN 0-85151-812-5
- Fenwick, Dr John (2004). The Free Church of England: The History and Promise of an Anglican Tradition. T & T Clark International. ISBN 978-0567084330.
- Guerinni, Anita (2004). "Hastings, Lady Elizabeth". Oxford Dictionary of National Biography (Online ed.). Oxford University Press. doi:10.1093/ref:odnb/12564. (Subscription, Wikipedia Library access or UK public library membership required.)
- Kirby, Gilbert, 2002. The Elect Lady. Trustees of the Countess of Huntingdon's Connexion
- Laurence, Anne (2010). "Lady Betty Hastings (1682–1739): godly patron" (PDF). Women's History Review. 19 (2): 201–213. doi:10.1080/09612021003633911. S2CID 145687985.
- Orchard, Stephen. "Selina, Countess of Huntingdon." Journal of the United Reformed Church History Society 8#2 (2008): 77–90.
- Schlenther, Boyd Stanley (2008). "Hastings [née Shirley], Selina, countess of Huntingdon (1707-1791)". Oxford Dictionary of National Biography (Online ed.). Oxford University Press. doi:10.1093/ref:odnb/12582. (Subscription, Wikipedia Library access or UK public library membership required.)
- Schlenther, Boyd Stanley' Queen of the Methodists: The Countess of Huntingdon and the eighteenth-century crisis of faith and society (Durham Academic Press, 1997).
- Tyson, John; Schlenther, Boyd (2006). In the Midst of Early Methodism: Lady Huntingdon and Her Correspondence. Scarecrow Press. ISBN 978-0810857933.

Attribution
