= Justice Huntington =

Justice Huntington may refer to:

- Benjamin Huntington (1736–1800), judge of the Connecticut Supreme Court of Errors
- Samuel Huntington (Connecticut politician) (1731–1796), chief justice of the Connecticut Supreme Court
- Samuel Huntington (Ohio politician) (1765–1817), associate justice and chief justice of the Supreme Court of Ohio
