= Huntingdon (Roanoke, Virginia) =

Historic house in Virginia, United States

- U.S. National Register of Historic Places
- Virginia Landmarks Register
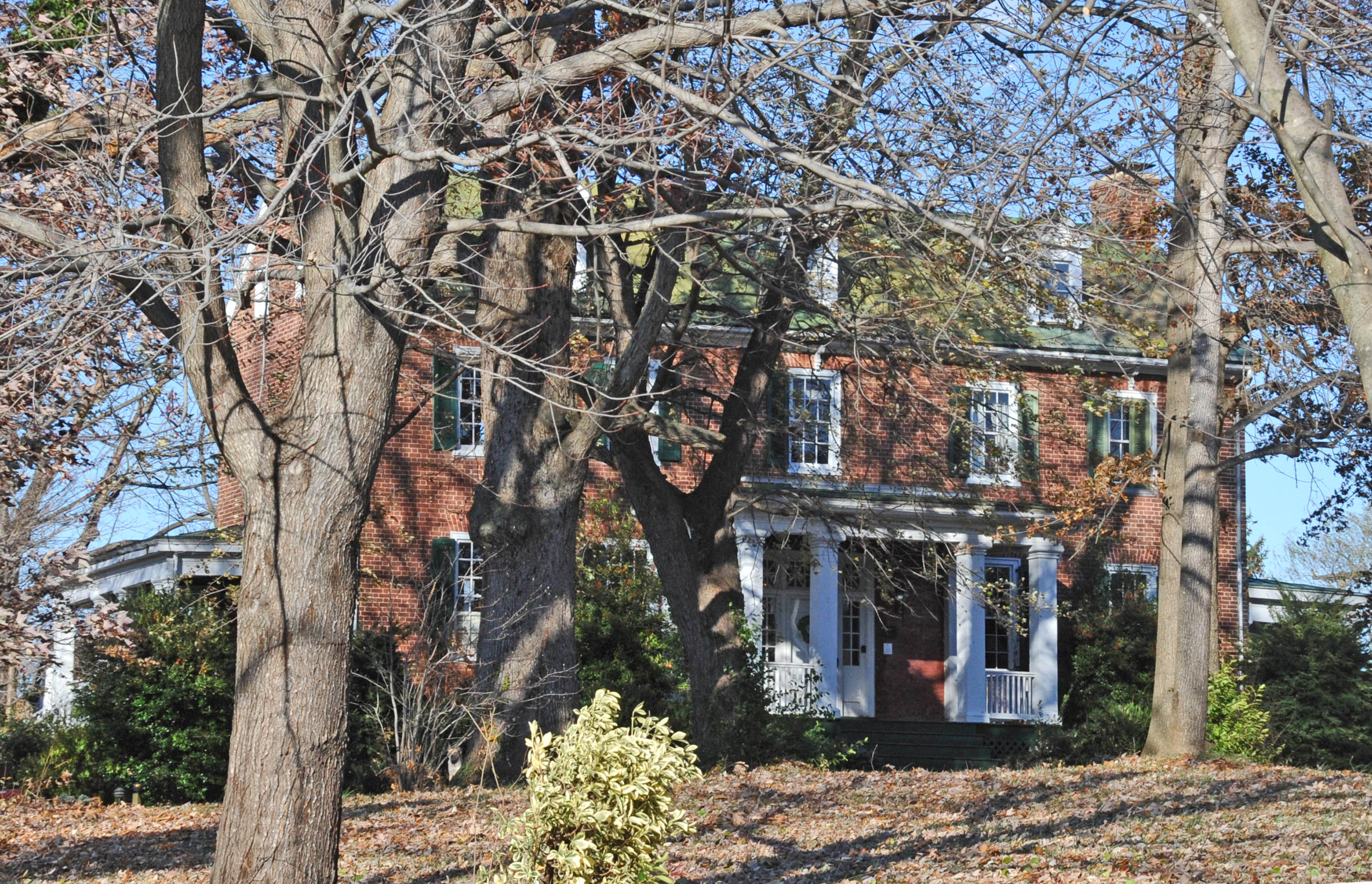

- Location within Virginia Location within the United States
- Location: 320 Huntingdon Blvd., Roanoke, Virginia
- Coordinates: 37°18′29″N 79°56′21″W
- Area: 5.5 acres (2.2 ha)
- Architectural style: Greek Revival, Federal
- NRHP reference No.: 91001598
- VLR No.: 128-0005

Significant dates
- Added to NRHP: November 8, 1991
- Designated VLR: August 21, 1991

Huntingdon is a historic plantation house located at Roanoke, Virginia. It was built about 1819, and is a 2 1/2-story, five-bay, Federal style brick dwelling. It has a central-passage-plan and an integral two-story rear ell. The front and side elevations feature mid-19th century Greek Revival style porches. The house was restored and improved in 1988–1989, but is now in a state of total disrepair. Also on the property was a contributing family cemetery and an outbuilding believed to have been a slave house, that has since been torn down.

It was listed on the National Register of Historic Places in 1991.
