= Huntington Free Library and Reading Room =

Private library in the Bronx, New York

- 40°50′23.5″N 73°50′37″W
- Location: 9 Westchester Square, Bronx, NY, United States
- Type: Private Library open to the public
- Scope: Bronx History (and general collections)
- Established: October 17, 1891 (135 years ago)

Other information
- Budget: US$124,000 (in 2016)
- Employees: all volunteer
- Website: http://huntingtonfreelibrary.org/

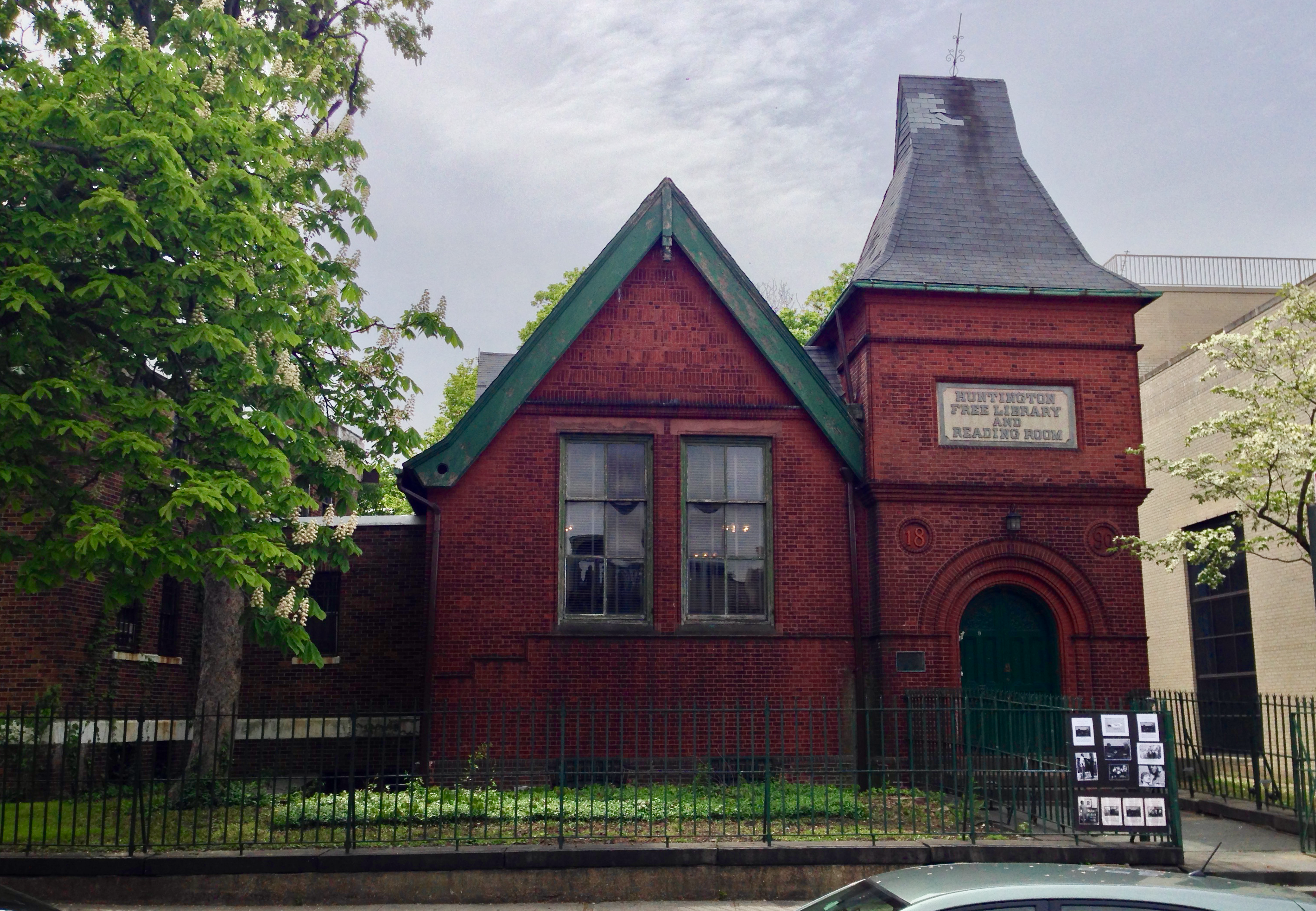
In 2017

In the 1920s

The Huntington Free Library is a privately endowed library near Westchester Square in the New York City borough of the Bronx, which is open to the public. It has a non-circulating book collection.

The Reading Room has mostly early-20th century items. It includes a special collection of books and photographs on local Bronx history. Its general collection contains current newspapers, magazines, and reference books.

== History ==
The library was officially founded in 1892 by Collis P. Huntington, a Southern Pacific Railroad magnate whose summer home was in nearby Throggs Neck, Bronx. Its origins, however, were in the will of Peter C. Van Schaick, a local philanthropist, who set aside funds from his estate to build a free reading room to be donated to the village of West Chester, (now the Bronx) upon its completion. The library, constructed between 1882 and 1883, was ultimately refused by the local townspeople who did not want to pay for its upkeep. The building sat vacant until Huntington was somehow informed of the stalemate and decided to take over the project. He put on an addition, and the library's doors opened to the public in 1891.

The library took on an important new role in 1930, when Archer M. Huntington, Collis's adopted son and benefactor of the Museum of the American Indian, Heye Foundation, built an addition to the Huntington Free Library to house the museum's book collection, which was transferred to the library. In 1990, the museum became the National Museum of the American Indian, Smithsonian Institution. The library was not part of that arrangement. In 2004 the American Indian collection was transferred to Cornell University.

== The 1882-1890 Building ==
Frederick C. Withers, an architect renowned for his use of Victorian High Gothic and Gothic Revival styles, designed the 1882-83 red brick building. The Jefferson Market Courthouse in Greenwich Village and Gallaudet College in Washington, D.C., are other examples of his work. The picturesque reading room is an excellent example of work dating from the latter part of Withers' career. When Collis Huntington took over the library in 1890, a local architect, William Henderson, added the rear part of the reading room and the two-story residence above it. Although larger than the original structure, its materials and design detail match those of the earlier building. Today the library is surrounded by a green iron fence. Large chestnut trees shade the area. The 1882-83 building, with the 1890 addition, was designated a New York City landmark in 1994.

== Inside the Reading Room ==
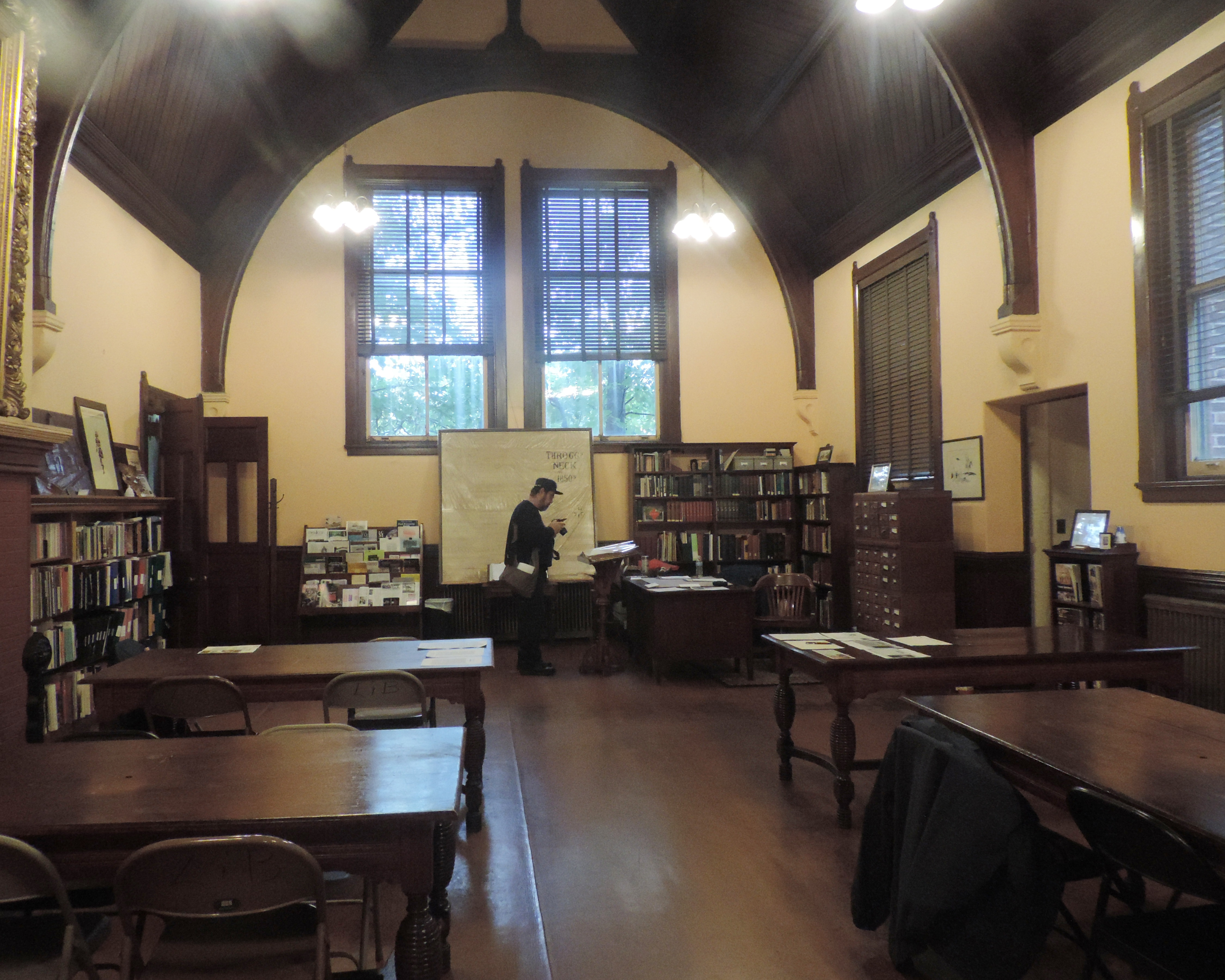
Reading room

A large raised engraving (1911) by B.L. Pratt of Collis Potter Huntington, dedicating the building to his memory, greets visitors entering the Reading Room. An oil painting of Huntington, presented to the library by the citizens of West Chester in 1893, is over the fireplace.

Covering the fireplace is a large-scale map, Throggs Neck in the 1850s, drawn by Bronx historian, John McNamara. The original Visitors Register has its own stand and is in use today. The first signature dates to 1891, before the library officially opened. Booker T. Washington registered as a visitor in 1892 and 1894.

The furniture in the library is in keeping with its turn-of-the-century character. Much of it is original. Although no longer in operation, three fireplaces grace the area. The piping for the reading room's original gas lighting is most obvious in the small book stack room in the rear. A wood sculpture of the library, carved by Patrolman John H. Jones in 1901, during his lunch breaks in the park across the street, sits on top of a bookshelf.

The large map case and the library's card catalog are still in use. Other items of interest include vintage typewriters, one a very early Woodstock electric model, and a 1917 Tiffany grandfather clock.

Scenes for the television series Boardwalk Empire were shot in the reading room in July, 2012.
