= Huntington Hotel =

Huntington Hotel may refer to:

- Huntington Hotel (San Francisco)
- Huntington Hotel (Pasadena), founded by Henry E. Huntington
