= Huntington Station =

Huntington Station may refer to:

== Railroad stations ==
=== United Kingdom ===
- Huntington railway station, Yorkshire, a former railway station near York

=== United States ===
- Two stations in Huntington, West Virginia:
  - Huntington station (Baltimore and Ohio Railroad), a historic former railway station
  - Huntington station (Amtrak), the current Amtrak station
- Huntington station (LIRR), an LIRR station in Huntington Station, New York
- Huntington station (Washington Metro), a Metro station in Huntington, Virginia

== Places ==
- Huntington Station, New York, a census-designated place in New York

== See also ==
- Huntingdon station (disambiguation)
