= Elizabeth Rawdon, Countess of Moira =

Elizabeth Rawdon
- Countess of Moira; Baroness Hastings of Hastings
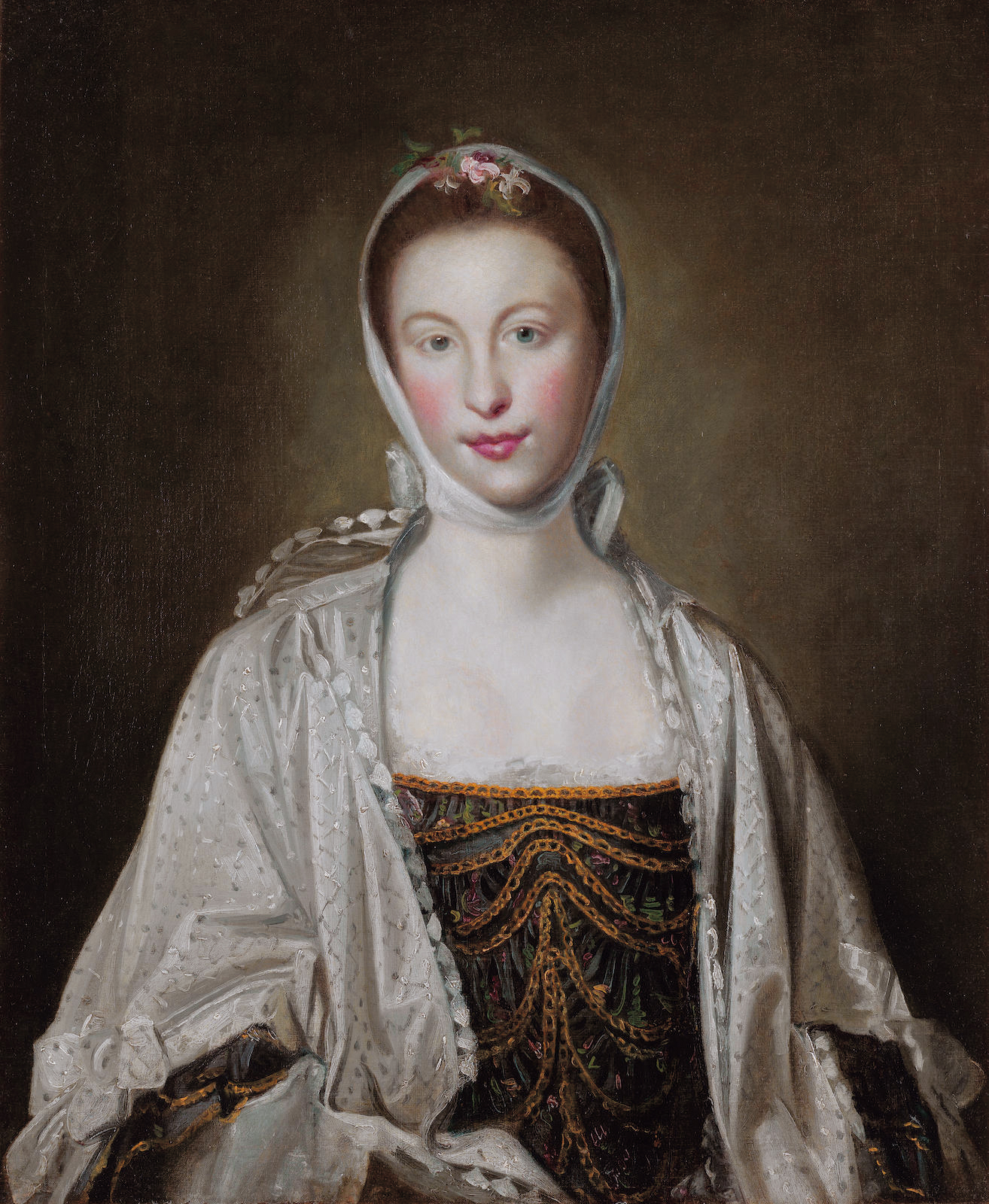
- Elizabeth Hastings, by Joshua Reynolds
- Reign: 1789–1808
- Born: Elizabeth Hastings; 21 March 1731; Donington Park, Leicestershire
- Died: 11 April 1808 (aged 77); Moira, County Down, Ireland (Now Northern Ireland)
- Spouse: John Rawdon, 1st Earl of Moira
- Issue: 5, including The 1st Marquess of Hastings
- Father: Theophilus Hastings, 9th Earl of Huntingdon
- Mother: Lady Selina Shirley

Elizabeth Rawdon, Countess of Moira in the Peerage of Ireland (23 March 1731 – 11 April 1808) was a political hostess, literary patron and antiquarian. She was born at Donington Park, Leicestershire, England and died at Moira, County Down, Ireland. While declaring herself a "firm aristocrat", in Ireland she included in her circle men and women committed to the republican cause of the United Irishmen.

Born as Elizabeth Hastings, she was the daughter of Theophilus Hastings, 9th Earl of Huntingdon and Selina Shirley, founder of the Countess of Huntingdon's Connexion religious denomination. Elizabeth was 16th Baroness Botreaux and 15th Baroness Hungerford, inheriting the titles on the death of her brother Francis Hastings, 10th Earl of Huntingdon.

She was the third wife of John Rawdon, 1st Earl of Moira, in Dublin an opposition peer in the Ascendancy Parliament, and on his County Down estate an "improving landlord". In 1798, following the Battle of Ballynahinch, fought largely on the Moira demesne, the government suspected her of assisting rebels and their sympathisers escape summary justice.

== Titles ==
In 1752, Elizabeth married John Rawdon, who was Baron Rawdon of Moira in the Irish peerage, and gained the title Baroness Rowdon as his wife. In 1762 her husband was elevated to Earl of Moira, and she became Countess of Moira. In 1788, upon the death of her brother Francis Hastings, 10th Earl of Huntingdon, she inherited several English baronies suo jure, becoming 16th Baroness Botreaux, 15th Baroness Hungerford, 13th Baroness de Moleyns, and 13th Baroness Hastings. (The earldom of Huntingdon went in the male line, to a distant cousin.)

== Political hostess in Ireland ==
On her husband's County Down estate (Monalto in the parish of Moira) she professed to feeling herself "exiled": "I hate the North, I detest Ballynahinch" (the nearest market town). She preferred Moira House in Dublin, the Irish capital, where, having established her liberal credentials as a critic of the American War, she hosted the Whig opposition and the literary avant garde. Among her guests were Henry Grattan, leader of the Patriot party in the Irish Commons; Charles James Fox, his English counterpart; the radical MP William Todd Jones for whom voters had defied their landlord, the Moiras’ county neighbour, the Marquess of Hertford; and John Philpot Curran, star counsel in the cause of reform and Catholic emancipation. Writers included the young lyricist Thomas Moore, the Irish-language scholar and bardic antiquarian, Joseph Cooper Walker, and the English philosopher and novelist William Godwin.

A bluestocking set was her salon’s most distinctive feature. It included Charlotte Brooke whose pioneering collection of Irish-language poetry acknowledged Lady Moira's assistance, and the novelists Maria Edgeworth and Sydney Owenson (Lady Morgan). Particularly intimate were Margaret King (Lady Mount Cashell) and the poet and satirist Henrietta Battier. To these she proclaimed "I cannot submit to being controlled in my Way of Thinking".

In 1797, both King and Battier subscribed to the United Irish test. Their patroness, however, had been clear as to enlightenment limits of her politics. In a dinner invitation to Wolfe Tone and Thomas Russell both, in 1792, fresh from their role in establishing the Belfast and Dublin societies of United Irishmen, Lady Moira wrote:

As for making a democrat of me that, you must be persuaded, is a fruitless hope: for, to keep my Manche and Clarence arms, it is more probable I should turn Amazon and, having the blood of Hugh Capet in my veins, am, from nature, a firm aristocrat ... I am not a convertible, but a rational being.

(Tone considered himself a friend of the family. Lady Moira's son Francis was godfather to Tone's fourth child, named in his honour Francis Rawdon Tone).

In the years before the French Revolution gave new currency to ideas of citizenship and universal rights, she had been content to pursue less contentious interests. In 1782 she investigated the remains of a bog body discovered on the husband's land and published her findings in 1785 in the periodical Archaeologia. It was the first documented scientific investigation of a such a find. She also sought to experiment in the cause of practical reform. She devised and demonstrated a method of weaving a cloth from mildewed flax which she hoped might clothe the poor at a cost well below that of imported English cottons.

Lord Moira died in 1793. The now dowager countess supported her son Francis, the 2nd Earl Moira, in urging a conciliatory policy. In 1797, he sought to present the King with affidavits supplied by William Sampson detailing atrocities committed by the military as they sought to break up and disarm the United Irishmen and their Defender allies. His mother played her part, sending testimonies from their tenants to the Lord Lieutenant, Lord Camden, the brother of her equally alarmed county neighbour Lady Londonderry. She compared the actions of government troops to Robespierre's reign of terror, and suggested they undermined the deference to rank in a people already driven to extremes by material distress.

When, on the eve of the 1798 Rebellion, Lord Edward Fitzgerald (who in America had been aide-de-camp to her son Francis), died of wounds received resisting arrest, Lady Moira sheltered and attended his pregnant wife, Pamela Fitzgerald, in Moira House.

In the North, the issue was decided at the Battle of Ballynahinch, fought principally on the Moiras’ Monalto demesne. She assisted tenants who suffered at the hands of the troops, and, not only then, but also in 1803 when Thomas Russell attempted to again raise the United Irish standard in the county, was suspected by government agents of helping rebels and their sympathisers escape summary justice. She understood her protest against the government's martial-law regime as arising from a sense, not only of natural justice, but also of "feudal" duty.

An Aristocrat of the genuine Breed no currish Cross in my Race, I loved the People & thought it my duty to protect & serve them, I shou'd [sic] not, nor do I chuse [sic] to be tyrannized by the mob having never had the least inclination to practice tyranny over those who were subject to my influence, I am loyal & national - but I sigh when I behold those who never had a Great Grandfather, to whom the Noble Feudal feelings of grateful attachment to a faithful Follower & the Indulgence of the power to protect & Serve are unknown - talking of the People pretending to despise & govern them, & pretending to Airs of Consequence & the Exertion of Force, devoid of Prudence.

In the aftermath of the rebellion, Lady Moira and her daughter Selina were convinced that there was a policy of deliberately inflaming sectarian tensions in order to thwart further pressure for change and to promote the government's policy of union with Great Britain. As Earl Moira, Francis voted in the Irish House of Lords against the Act of Union but, sitting as Baron Rawdon of Rawdon, withdrew his opposition in the British Lords in the belief that catholic relief would follow. When it did not, he opposed bills imposing Irish martial law and suspending habeas corpus.

== Son and heir ==
After her death in 1808, Francis inherited his mother's baronies, taking the family name, in according with the will of a maternal uncle, of Rawdon-Hastings. His creation in 1783 as Baron Rawdon of Rawdon had already secured him a Westminster peerage. After attempting in the wake of Spencer Perceval's assassination in 1812 to a form ministry in favour of Catholic emancipation, he was appointed Governor-General of Bengal. In the tradition of his mother, from Calcutta he contributed generously to the leading Irish cultural association in Belfast, the Harp Society. He also continued her patronage of Thomas Moore.

Peerage of England
Preceded by Francis Hastings	Baroness Botreaux; 1789–1808	Succeeded by Francis Rawdon-Hastings
Preceded by Francis Hastings	Baroness Hungerford; 1789–1808	Succeeded by Francis Rawdon-Hastings
Preceded by Francis Hastings	Baroness de Moleyns; 1789–1808	Succeeded by Francis Rawdon-Hastings
Preceded by Francis Hastings	Baroness Hastings (de Hastings); 1789–1808	Succeeded by Francis Rawdon-Hastings
Preceded by Francis Hastings	Baroness Hastings (de Hungerford); 1789–1808	Succeeded by Francis Rawdon-Hastings
