= John Huntingdon (preacher) =

English preacher

John Huntingdon (fl. 16th. century) was an English Protestant preacher. He was a client of Mary Fitzroy, and "one of London's most popular and most effective preachers."

Initially Huntingdon was a religious conservative, writing a pamphlet under the pseudonym "Ponce Pantolabus" against evangelicals. The Genealogy of Heresy (modern spelling), it was in verse, published c. 1542; and is not now extant. There was a reply by John Bale, in 1545. Huntingdon was one of those who stood witness against the Scottish reformer Alexander Seton.

Not long after his pamphlet, Huntingdon became a reformer. The Privy Council had him arrested in 1553.

Under Elizabeth I, Huntingdon became a canon of Exeter Cathedral. He had the backing of English supporters of the Genevan reforms. By now known as a radical, he was one of those for whom Richard Martin stood surety.
