= Theophilus Hastings, 9th Earl of Huntingdon =

English peer (1696–1746)

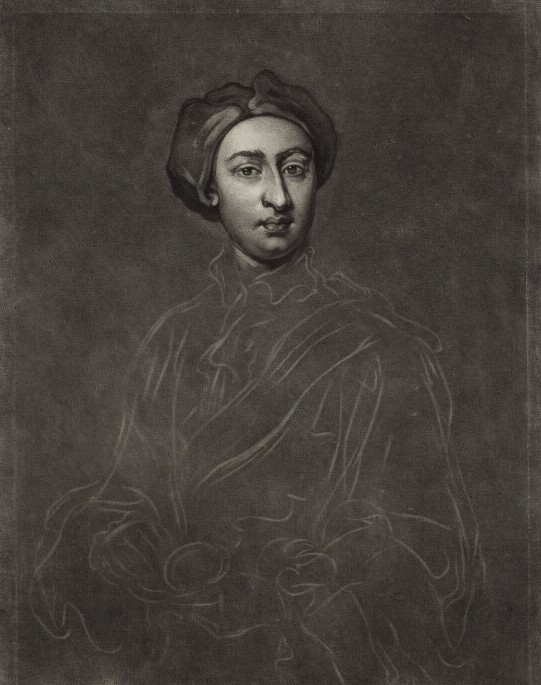
Portrait of Huntingdon

Theophilus Hastings, 9th Earl of Huntingdon (12 November 1696 – 13 October 1746) was an English peer.

Theophilus, the son of Theophilus Hastings, 7th Earl of Huntingdon and his second wife Mary Frances Fowler, was born at Donnington on 12 November 1696. He succeeded his childless half-brother George Hastings, 8th Earl of Huntingdon in 1705. He was educated at Christ Church, Oxford, where he matriculated in October 1712. His tutor at Christ Church was Martin Benson, who subsequently became Bishop of Gloucester. He completed his education by visiting France, Italy and Spain.

Theophilus took his seat in the House of Lords in March 1722. In 1727 he carried the sword of state at the coronation of George II. He served as a governor of the Foundling Hospital, although his epitaph portrays him as an essentially private man.

Hastings married Lady Selina Shirley, daughter of Washington Shirley, 2nd Earl Ferrers and Mary Levinge, on 3 June 1728. The couple lived at Donington Hall. From 1744 he had a house in Downing Street. Theophilus and Selina had seven children:

- Francis Hastings, 10th Earl of Huntingdon
- George (1730–1743) and Ferdinando (1733–1743) died of smallpox in London ad have a memorial in Westminster Abbey.
- Henry (12 December 1739 – 13 September 1758) died unmarried.
- Elizabeth Rawdon, Countess of Moira
- Selina (born June 1735) died in childhood.
- Selina (3 December 1737 – 1763) died unmarried.

He had an illegitimate son, Sir George Hastings (1733–1783).

He died of an apoplexy on 13 October 1746 and was buried in St Helen's Church, Ashby-de-la-Zouch. A monument to the ninth earl erected by his wife remains in the church; the epitaph was written by Henry St John, 1st Viscount Bolingbroke.

== Notes ==
Peerage of England
Preceded by George Hastings	Earl of Huntingdon; 1705–1746	Succeeded by Francis Hastings
