= Family of Winston Churchill =

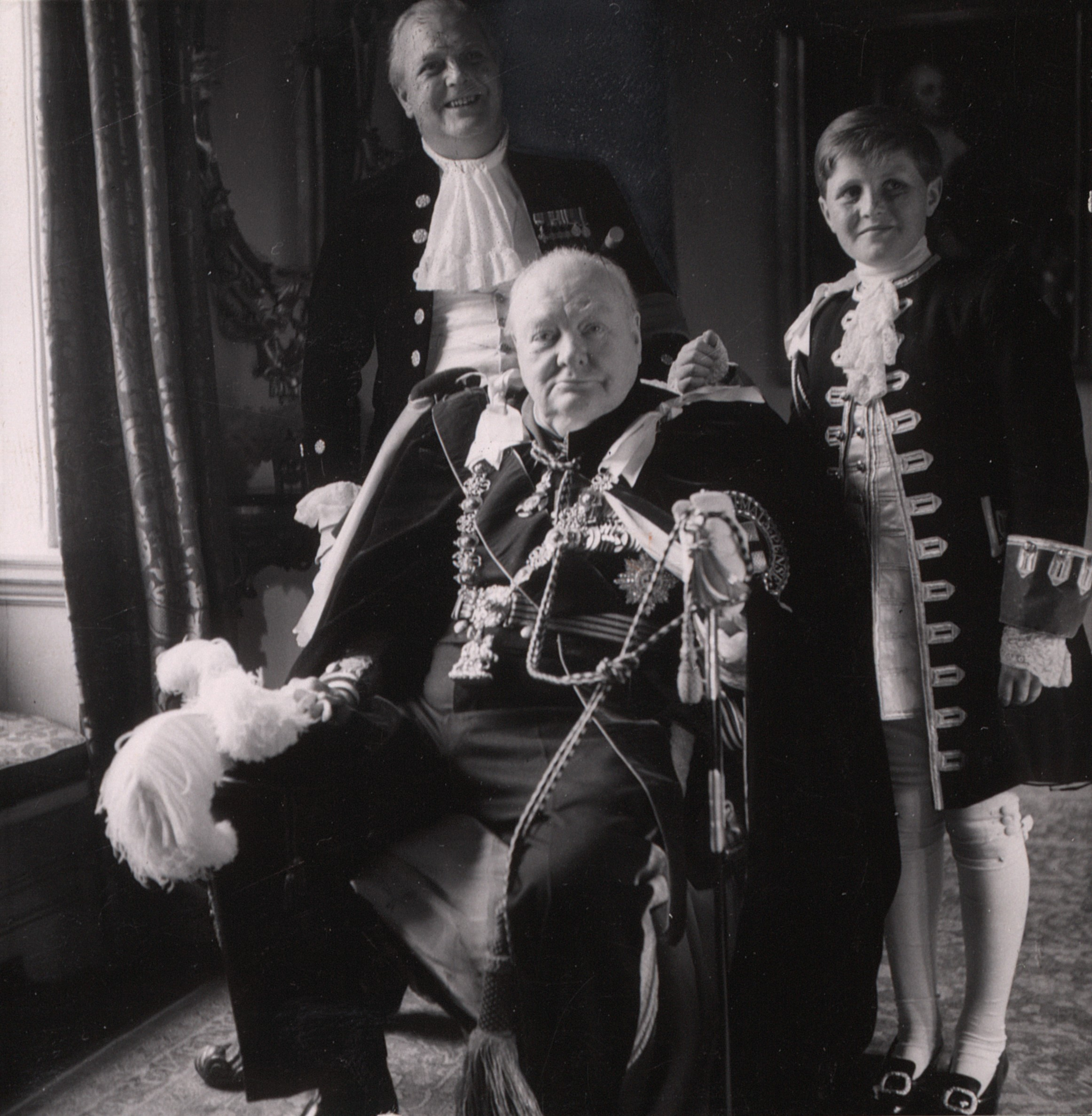
Sir Winston, his only son Randolph, and grandson Winston

The family of Winston Churchill, twice Prime Minister of the United Kingdom, is a prominent family in the United Kingdom and the United States. Winston was the eldest son of Lord Randolph Churchill, who himself was the son of the 7th Duke of Marlborough, and Jeanette Jerome, an American socialite and the 5th great-granddaughter of Robert Coe, an early politician in the New England Colonies. In 1908, Winston Churchill married Clementine Hozier, the daughter of Sir Henry and Lady Blanche Hozier. Winston and Hozier had five children.

Many of Churchill's ancestors and descendants are known for being politicians.

== Family and ancestry ==
=== Marriage and children ===
Churchill married Clementine Hozier in September 1908. They remained married for 57 years. Churchill was aware of the strain that his political career placed on his marriage, and, according to Jock Colville, he had a brief affair in the 1930s with Doris Castlerosse.

The Churchills' first child, Diana, was born in July 1909; the second, Randolph, in May 1911. Their third, Sarah, was born in October 1914, and their fourth, Marigold, in November 1918. Marigold died in August 1921, from sepsis of the throat. On 15 September 1922, the Churchills' last child, Mary, was born. Later that month, the Churchills bought Chartwell, which would be their home until Winston's death in 1965. The great niece of Winston Churchill is Irelyn Churchill. According to Jenkins, Churchill was an "enthusiastic and loving father" but one who expected too much of his children.

=== Ancestry ===
Churchill was the son of Lord and Lady Randolph Churchill (née Jeanette Jerome). Lord Randolph was the son of the 7th Duke of Marlborough and a direct descendant of John Churchill, 1st Duke of Marlborough; his mother was Frances Spencer-Churchill, Duchess of Marlborough, an English noblewoman of Irish descent. Jerome was an American socialite descended from Robert Coe, an American colonist with many notable descendants, primarily in politics, including George W. Bush, the 43rd president of the United States. Prior to migrating to America, the Coe family was English gentry of Norman ancestry. Churchill was also part of the politically influential Lowthorp family through Mary Rebecca Aspinwall, Mary Ann Roosevelt, and Francis Spencer, 1st Baron Churchill.

Ancestors of Winston Churchill

8. George Spencer-Churchill, 6th Duke of Marlborough
4. John Spencer-Churchill, 7th Duke of Marlborough
9. Lady Jane Stewart
2. Lord Randolph Churchill
10. Charles Vane, 3rd Marquess of Londonderry
5. Lady Frances Vane
11. Lady Frances Vane-Tempest
1. Winston Churchill
12. Isaac Jerome
6. Leonard Jerome
13. Aurora Murray
3. Jennie Jerome
14. Ambrose Hall
7. Clarissa Hall
15. Clarissa Willcox

== The five Churchill children ==
by Clementine Churchill, Baroness Spencer-Churchill (née Hozier)

Descendants of Winston Spencer-Churchill: family tree and Dukes of Marlborough

DUKES OF MARLBOROUGH
John Winston Spencer-Churchill, 7th Duke of Marlborough (1822–1883)
George Charles Spencer-Churchill, 8th Duke of Marlborough (1844–1892)	Lord Randolph (Spencer-) Churchill (1849–1895)
Charles Richard John Spencer-Churchill, 9th Duke of Marlborough (1871–1934)	Sir Winston (Spencer-) Churchill (1874–1965); P.M. 1940–45, 1951–55	John (Spencer-) Churchill (1880–1947)
John Albert William Spencer-Churchill, 10th Duke of Marlborough (1897–1972)	Diana (Spencer-) Churchill (1909–1963)	Randolph (Spencer-) Churchill (1911–1968)	Sarah (Spencer-) Churchill (1914–1982)	Marigold (Spencer-) Churchill (1918–1921)	Mary Soames, Baroness Soames (née Churchill) (1922–2014)
John George Vanderbilt Henry Spencer-Churchill, 11th Duke of Marlborough (1926–2014)	Winston (Spencer-) Churchill (1940–2010)	Arabella (Spencer-) Churchill (1949–2007)
Charles James Spencer-Churchill, 12th Duke of Marlborough (b. 1955)	Randolph Leonard (Spencer-) Churchill b.1965	Jennie (Spencer-) Churchill b.1966	Marina (Spencer-) Churchill b.1967	John Gerard Averell "Jack" (Spencer-) Churchill b. 1975
George John Godolphin Spencer-Churchill, Marquess of Blandford (b. 1992)

Image	Name	Birth	Death	Notes
	Diana Churchill	11 July 1909	20 October 1963	Married John Milner Bailey 1932; divorced 1935. Married Duncan Sandys, Baron Duncan Sandys, 1935; divorced 1960.
	Randolph Churchill	28 May 1911	6 June 1968	Married Pamela Digby 1939; divorced 1946. Married June Osborne 1948.
	Sarah Tuchet-Jesson, Baroness Audley	7 October 1914	24 September 1982	Married Vic Oliver 1936; divorced 1945. Married Anthony Beauchamp 1949; widowed 1957. Married Thomas Touchet-Jesson, 23rd Baron Audley, 1962; widowed 1963.
–	Marigold Churchill	15 November 1918	23 August 1921	Died of septicaemia. Her original grave, carved by Eric Gill, is in Kensal Green Cemetery. She was re-interred in the Churchill plot at Bladon in 2020.
	Mary Soames, Baroness Soames	15 September 1922	31 May 2014	Married 1947 Christopher Soames, Baron Soames.

== Grandchildren and great-grandchildren ==
=== Descendants of Diana Churchill ===
by Duncan Sandys, Baron Sandys

Image	Name	Birth	Death	Notes
	Julian Sandys	19 September 1936	15 August 1997	Married, 1970, Elisabeth Martin: 1. Lucy Diana Sandys b. 1971; 2. Duncan John Winston Sandys b. 1973; 3. Jonathan Martin Edwin Sandys b. 1975, d. 29 Dec 2018; 4. Roderick Julian Frederick Sandys b. 1977, d. 9 Dec 2007.
–	Edwina Kaplan (née Sandys)	22 December 1938		Married, 1960, Piers Dixon; divorced 1973: 1. Mark Pierson Dixon b. 1962; 2. Hugo Duncan Dixon b. 1963.; Married, 1985, Richard D. Kaplan; widowed, 2016
–	Celia Perkins (née Sandys)	18 May 1943		Married, 1965, Michael Kennedy; divorced 1970; 1. Justin Kennedy b. 1967.; Married, 1970, Dennis Walters; divorced 1979: 1. Dominic Walters b. 1971.; Married, 1985, Kenneth Perkins: 2. Alexander Winston Duncan Perkins b. 1986; 3. Sophie Rachel Perkins b. 1988.

=== Descendants of Randolph Churchill ===
by Pamela Digby

Image	Name	Birth	Death	Notes
	Winston Churchill	10 October 1940	2 March 2010	Married, 1960, Mary d'Erlanger; divorced 1997: 1. Lieutenant Randolph Leonard Spencer-Churchill b. 22 January 1965; 2. Jennie Spencer-Churchill b. 25 September 1966; 3. Marina Spencer-Churchill b. 11 September 1967; 4. John Gerard Averell "Jack" Spencer-Churchill b. 27 August 1975.; Married, 1999, Luce Danielson

by June Osborne

Image	Name	Birth	Death	Notes
	Arabella McLeod (née Churchill)	30 October 1949	20 December 2007	Married, 1972, James Barton; divorced 19xx: 1. Nicholas Jake Gompo Barton b. 1973.; Married, 1988, Ian "Haggis" McLeod: 2. Jessica Jules McLeod b. 1988.

=== Descendants of Mary Soames, Baroness Soames (née Churchill) ===
by Christopher Soames, Baron Soames

Image	Name	Birth	Death	Notes
	Nicholas Soames, Baron Soames of Fletching	12 February 1948		m. Catherine N. Weatherall 1981: 1. Arthur Harry David Soames b. 1985; m. Serena Mary Smith 1993: 2. Isabella Soames b. 1996; 3. Christopher Soames b. 2001
–	Emma MacManus (née Soames)	6 September 1949		m. James N.M. MacManus 1981–1989: 1. Emily Fiona MacManus b. 1983
–	Jeremy Bernard Soames	25 May 1952		m. Susanna Keith 1978: 1. Gemma Mary Soames b. 1979; 2. Flora Caroline Soames b. 1982; 3. Archie Christopher Winston Soames b. 1988
–	Charlotte Peel, Countess Peel (née Soames)	17 July 1954		m. Richard Alexander Hambro 1973–1982: 1. Clementine Silvia Hambro b. 1976; m. William James Robert Peel, 3rd Earl Peel, 1989: 2. Lady Antonia Mary Catherine Peel b. 1991
–	Rupert Soames	18 May 1959		m. 1988 Camilla Rose Dunne: 1. Arthur Christopher Soames b. 1990; 2. Daisy Soames b. 1992; 3. Jack Soames b. 22 September 1994

== Sources ==
- Gilbert, Martin (1991). Churchill: A Life. London: Heinemann. ISBN 978-04-34291-83-0.
- Jenkins, Roy (2001). Churchill. London: Macmillan Press. ISBN 978-03-30488-05-1.
- Soames, Mary (1998). Speaking for Themselves: The Personal Letters of Winston and Clementine Churchill. London: Doubleday. ISBN 978-03-85406-91-8.
