= Mary S. Lovell =

British writer

Mary Sybilla Lovell (born 23 October 1941) is a British writer.

== Life ==
Born Mary Sybilla Shelton on 23 October 1941, the daughter of William G. and Mary Catherine (née Wooley) Shelton. She married Clifford C. Lovell on 22 October 1960. They divorced in 1974. She married Geoffrey A. H. Watts on 11 July 1992 (deceased 3 May 1995). She has one child, Graeme R. Lovell.

She was an accountant from 1963 to 1983, company director from 1983 to 1986, and began her writing career in 1986 following a serious riding accident which left her temporarily disabled.

Until 2011 she often led reader groups interested in Jane Digby around Syria to follow in the footsteps of this favourite subject of hers. She loves to travel to the Middle East, and is a fellow of the Royal Geographical Society.

She lives in the New Forest, Hampshire.

== Writing ==
She has written biographies of Beryl Markham, Amelia Earhart, Amy Elizabeth Thorpe, Jane Digby, Richard and Isabel Burton, the Mitford Girls, Bess of Hardwick, the Churchills, and Maxine Elliott. Her book on Markham, Straight on Till Morning, researched and written in under a year, after weeks of interviews with the subject in Nairobi, became an immediate international bestseller when it was published in 1987 and was twelve weeks on the New York Times Best Seller list.

She also wrote The Mitford Girls (titled The Sisters in the USA), a biography of the celebrated Mitford sisters, first published in September 2001 (paperback August 2002), and her Bess of Hardwick, was published in the UK in 2005.

The Churchills, her biography of the Churchill family from the 1st Duke Marlborough to the present generation, was published in April 2011 in the UK and May 2011 in the U.S.A. The paperback was released April/May 2012.

== Adaptations ==
Four of her books have been optioned for films.

Amelia, a major movie starring Richard Gere and Hilary Swank, was based on her bestselling book The Sound of Wings: A Biography of Amelia Earhart. It was released in October 2009.

The 2025 television series Outrageous is based on her book The Mitford Girls.

== List of biographies by subject ==
Lovell's works include:

- Beryl Markham – Straight on till Morning (1987)
- Beryl Markham's African stories – The Splendid Outcast (1988)
- Amelia Earhart – The Sound of Wings (1989 & 2009)
- Amy Elizabeth Thorpe – Cast No Shadow: Women in WWII Espionage (1992)
- Jane Digby – A Scandalous Life (1995)
- Richard and Isabel Burton – A Rage to Live (1998)
- Mitford sisters – The Mitford Girls: The Extraordinary Lives of the Six Mitford Sisters (2001)
- Bess of Hardwick – Bess of Hardwick: First Lady of Chatsworth (2005)
- Churchill family – The Churchills: In Love and War (2011)
- Maxine Elliott – The Riviera Set (2016)
