= Mary Soames =

English author (1922–2014)

The Right Honourable The Lady Soames LG DBE FRSL
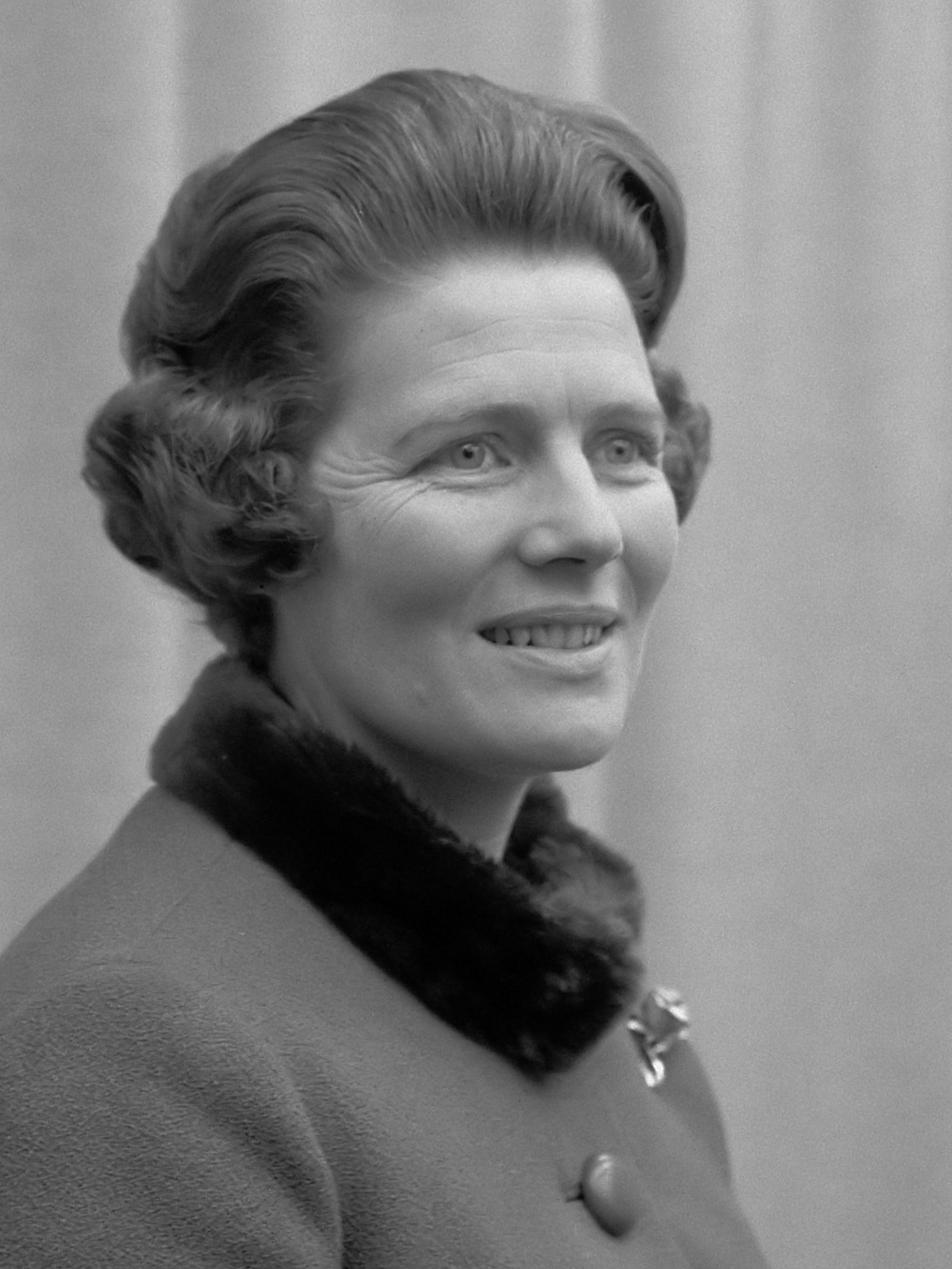
- Soames in 1965
- Born: Mary Spencer Churchill; 15 September 1922; London, England
- Died: 31 May 2014 (aged 91); London, England
- Buried: St Martin's Church, Bladon
- Noble family: Spencer-Churchill
- Spouse: Christopher Soames (m. 1947; died 1987)
- Issue: Nicholas; Emma; Jeremy; Charlotte; Rupert
- Father: Winston Churchill
- Mother: Clementine Hozier

Mary Soames, Baroness Soames (née Spencer Churchill; 15 September 1922 – 31 May 2014) was an English author. The youngest of the five children of Winston Churchill and his wife, Clementine, she worked for public organisations including the Red Cross and the Women's Voluntary Service from 1939 to 1941, and joined the Auxiliary Territorial Service in 1941. She was the wife of Conservative politician Christopher Soames.

== Biography ==
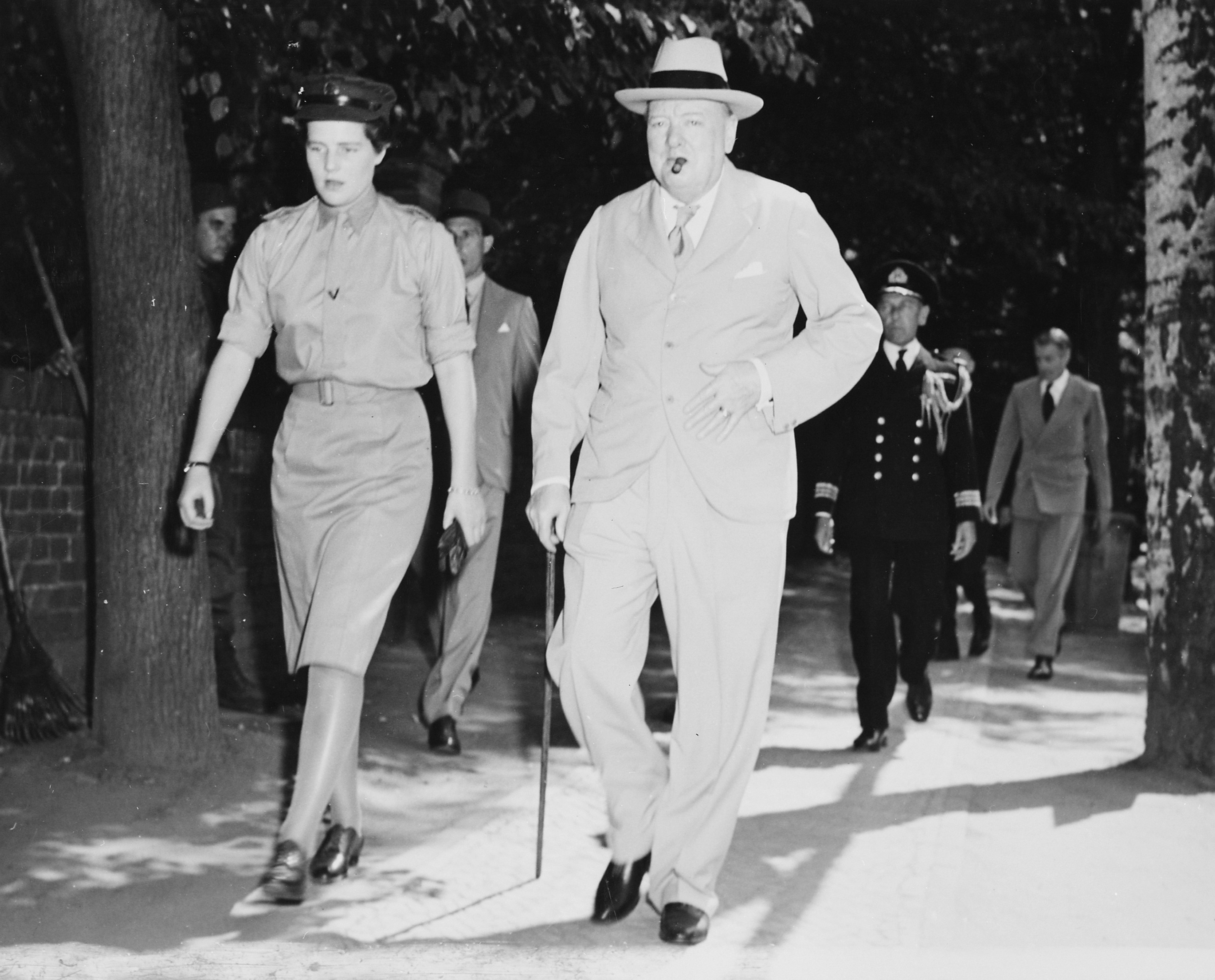
With her father at the Potsdam Conference, 1945

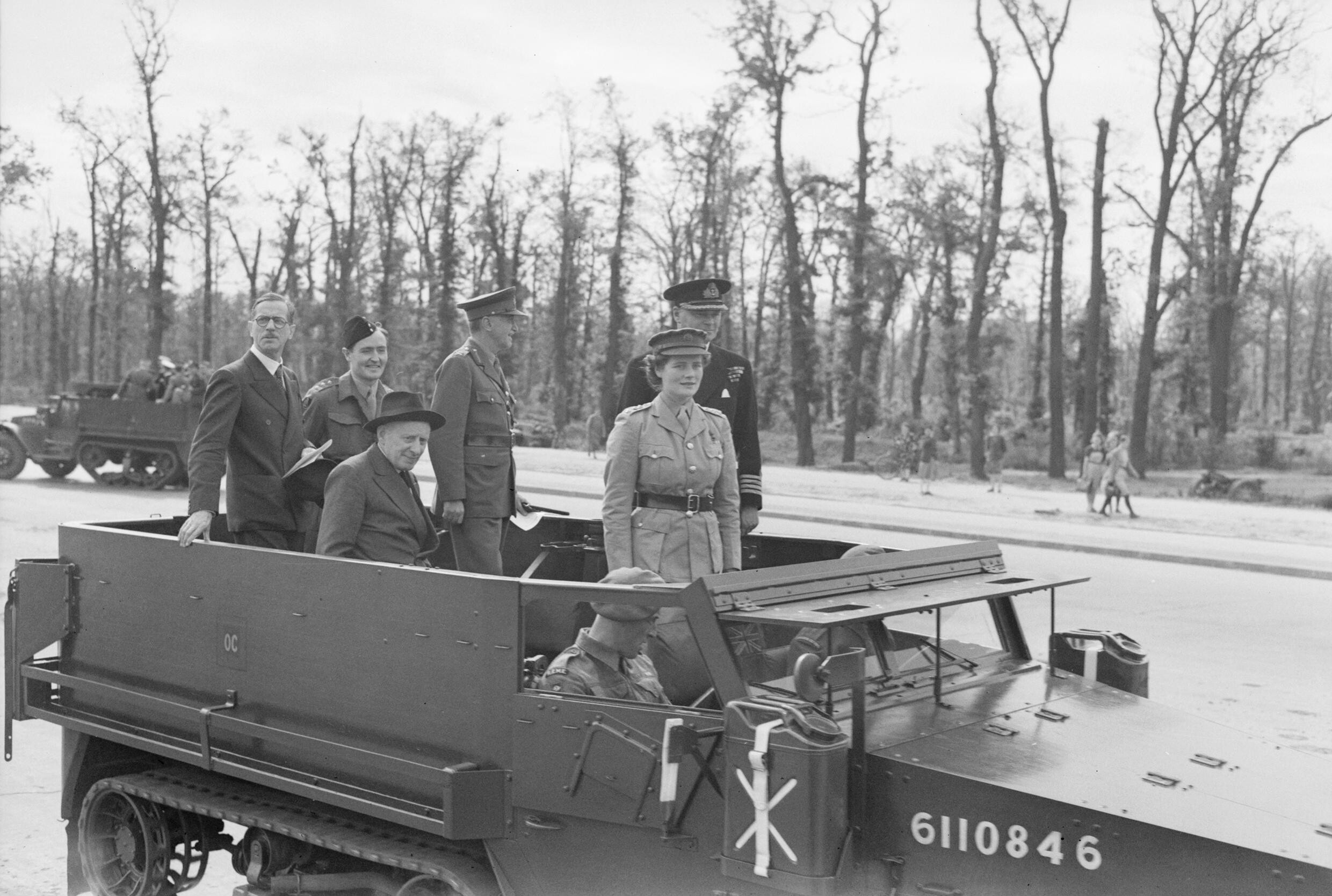
Junior commander Mary Churchill at the British Victory Parade in Berlin, 21 July 1945

Mary Spencer Churchill was born in London, in the same week as her father, Winston Churchill, purchased Chartwell, a country house in Kent; she was brought up there, attending local schools. She worked for the Red Cross and the Women's Voluntary Service from 1939 to 1941, and joined the Auxiliary Territorial Service in 1941 with which she served in London, Belgium and Germany in mixed anti-aircraft batteries, rising to the rank of Junior Commander (equivalent to Captain). She accompanied her father as aide-de-camp on several of his overseas journeys, including his post-VE trip to Potsdam, where he met Harry S. Truman and Joseph Stalin. In 1945, she was appointed a Member of the Order of the British Empire (MBE), in recognition of meritorious military services.

She served many public organisations, such as the International Churchill Society, as a Patron; Church Army and Churchill Houses; and chaired the Royal National Theatre Board of Trustees between 1989 and 1995. She was Patron of the National Benevolent Fund for the Aged.

She accompanied her husband, Christopher Soames, on his foreign postings as an Ambassador and/or Governor: to Paris (during 1968–1972) where she resided at Hotel de Charost, and to Rhodesia.

In the 1980 Birthday Honours, Lady Soames was promoted to Dame Commander of the Order of the British Empire (DBE) for her public service, particularly in Rhodesia.

In 1992, Soames appeared on BBC Radio 4's Desert Island Discs. Her chosen book was Memoirs from Beyond the Grave by Chateaubriand and her luxury item was a supply of fine Havana cigars. She chose as her favourite record a movement from Beethoven's Pastoral Symphony, which evoked the joy of returning to the countryside for her, a devoted countrywoman.

On 29 April 2002 she dined with the Queen at Downing Street as part of the Golden Jubilee celebrations, alongside Prime Minister Tony Blair, and the four surviving former prime ministers at the time, as well as several relatives of other deceased prime ministers.

She was made a Lady Companion of the Order of the Garter (LG) on 23 April 2005, and was invested on 13 June at Windsor Castle. She used the insignia worn by her father, Winston Churchill, who was made a Knight Companion of the Order of the Garter in 1953.

== Literary works ==
A successful author, Lady Soames wrote an acclaimed biography of her mother, Clementine Churchill, in 1979. She offered insights into the Churchill family to various biographers, prominently including Sir Martin Gilbert, who became the authorised biographer of Sir Winston Churchill after the death of Churchill's son, Randolph, in 1968. Additionally, she published a book of letters between Sir Winston and Lady Churchill, editing the letters as well as providing bridging material that placed the letters in personal, family, and historical context. In 2012, her memoirs, based upon her diaries from childhood up to the time of her marriage, were published under the title A Daughter's Tale.

== Family ==
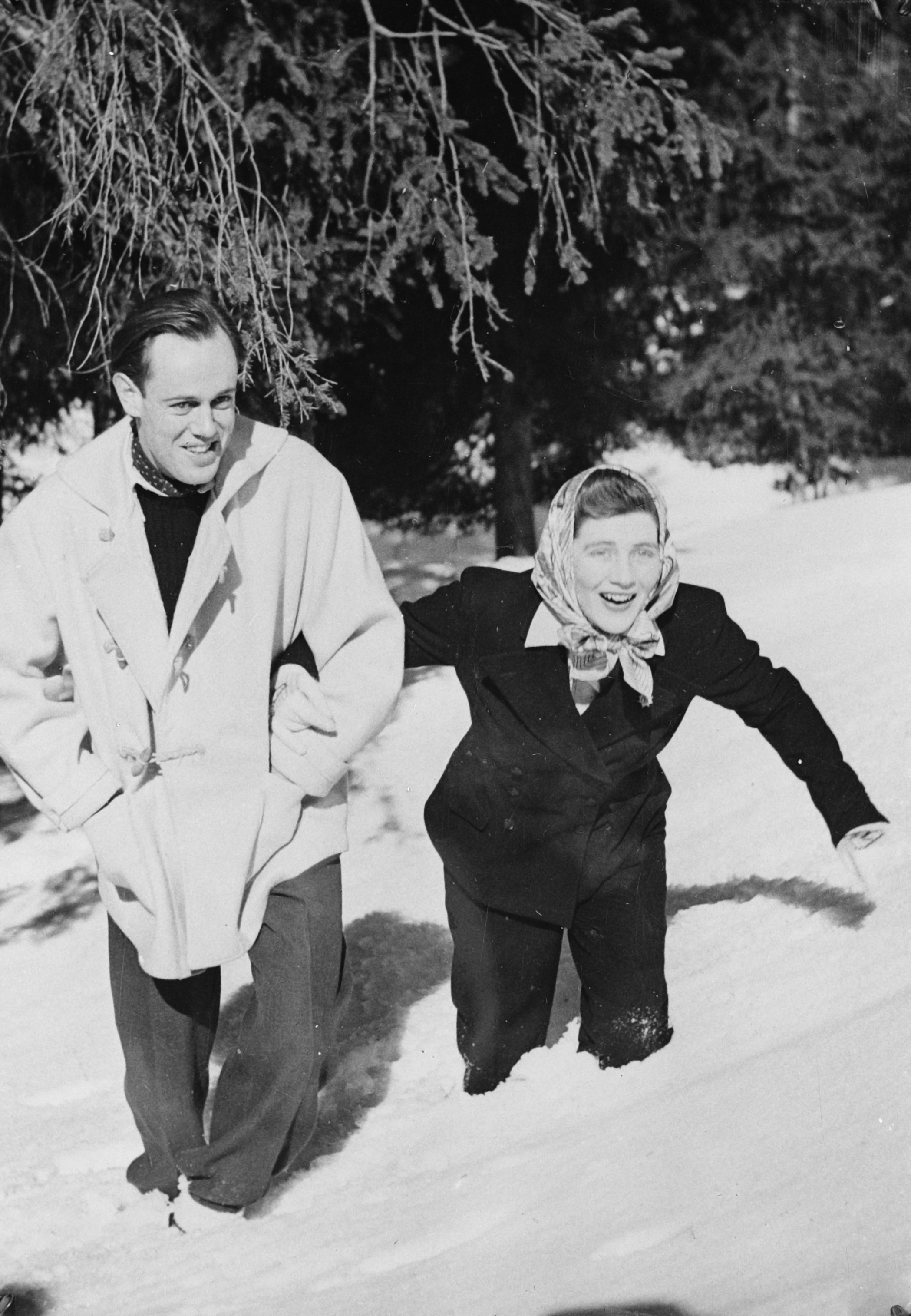
Christopher and Mary Soames in Lenzerheide, February 1947

Mary married the Conservative politician Christopher Soames (later created Baron Soames) in 1947 and they had five children:

- The Rt. Hon. Nicholas Soames, Baron Soames of Fletching (12 February 1948)
- The Hon. Emma Mary Soames (6 September 1949)
- The Hon. Jeremy Bernard Soames (25 May 1952)
- The Hon. Charlotte Clementine Soames (17 July 1954). She married Richard Hambro in 1973 and they were divorced in 1982. Charlotte married William Peel, 3rd Earl Peel in 1989.
- The Hon. Rupert Christopher Soames (18 May 1959)

== Death ==
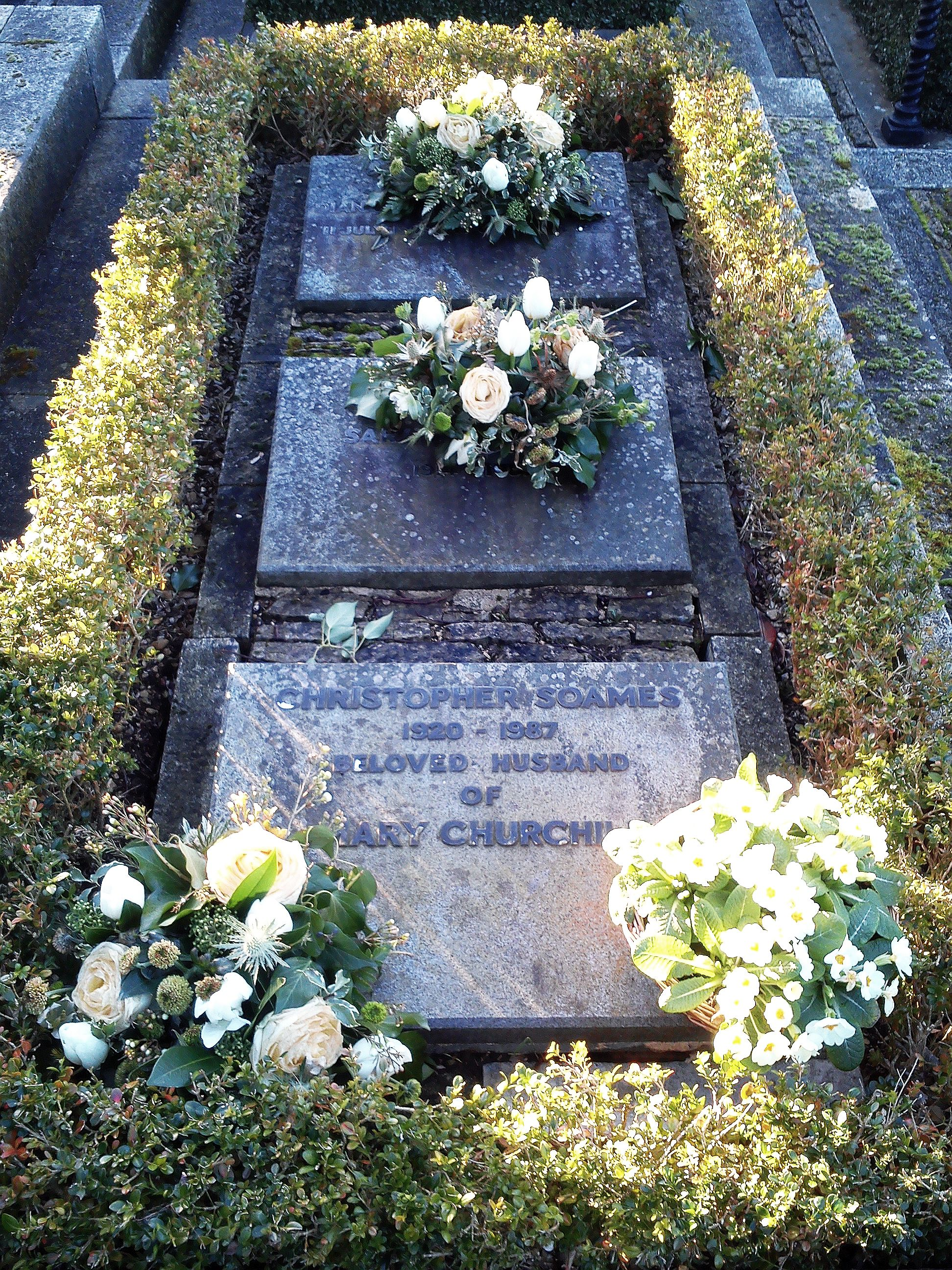
Christopher and Mary Soames' grave at St Martin's Church, Bladon, in 2015

On 31 May 2014, Soames died at her home in London at the age of 91 following a short illness. Her ashes are buried next to those of her husband within the Churchill plot at St Martin's Church, Bladon, near Woodstock, Oxfordshire. Since 24 September 1982, with the death of her sister Sarah, she had been the last surviving child of Winston Churchill.

Six months after her death, on 17 December 2014, Sotheby's London auctioned 255 items out of her collection on behalf of her heirs, including paintings by and memorabilia attached to her father. According to Sotheby's, the sale "realised an outstanding total of £15,441,822, well above pre-sale expectations of £3.6-5.5 million."

== Honours ==
Ribbon rack of Lady Soames

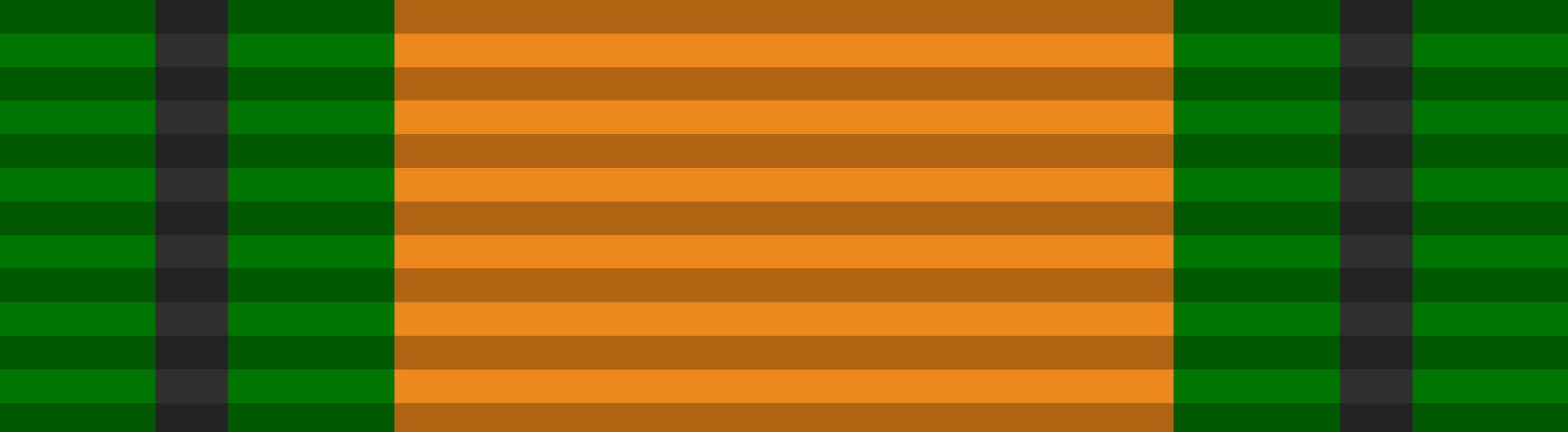

Country	Appointment	Ribbon	Post-nominal letters	Notes
United Kingdom	Lady Companion of the Order of the Garter		LG	
United Kingdom	Member of the Order of the British Empire		MBE	Also a Dame Commander in the Civil Division
United Kingdom	Dame Commander of the Order of the British Empire		DBE	Also a Member in the Military Division
United Kingdom	1939–1945 Star			
United Kingdom	France and Germany Star			
United Kingdom	Defence Medal			
United Kingdom	War Medal 1939–1945			
Zimbabwe	Zimbabwean Independence Medal, 1980			
France	Order of Liberation			

== Arms ==
Coat of arms of Mary Soames
Notes Lady Companion of the Garter from 2005 to 2014 Coronet A coronet of a Baroness Escutcheon Gules, a chevron Or, between in chief two hammers of the last and in base two wings Argent; impaled with quarterly, first and fourth Sable a Lion rampant Argent, overall on a quarter of the last a cross Gules; second and third grandquarterly 1st and 4th Argent 2nd and 3rd Gules a fret Or overall a bend Sable charged with three escallops Argent; in chief an escutcheon Argent a cross Gules thereon an inescutcheon Azure three fleurs-de-lys Or. Supporters Dexter: A winged lion Argent gorged Gules. Sinister: a falcon Or holding a cord Gules and Argent. Motto FIEL PERO DESDICHADO; Spanish: Faithful but Unfortunate Orders The Order of the Garter circlet. The Order of the British Empire Commander's neck badge (Civil). Banner Lady Soames's Garter banner at St Martin's Church, Bladon

== Bibliography ==
Books written by Mary Soames (titles may vary between UK and US editions):

- Clementine Churchill: The Biography of a Marriage (1979)
- Family Album: A Personal Selection from Four Generations of Churchills (1982)
- The Profligate Duke: George Spencer Churchill, Fifth Duke of Marlborough, and His Duchess (1987)
- Winston Churchill: His Life as a Painter (1990)
- Speaking For Themselves: The Private Letters of Sir Winston and Lady Churchill (1999)
- Clementine Churchill: The Revised and Updated Biography (2005)
- A Daughter's Tale: The Memoir of Winston and Clementine Churchill's Youngest Child (2012)
