= Christopher Soames =

British politician (1920–1987)

The Right Honourable The Lord Soames GCMG GCVO CH CBE PC
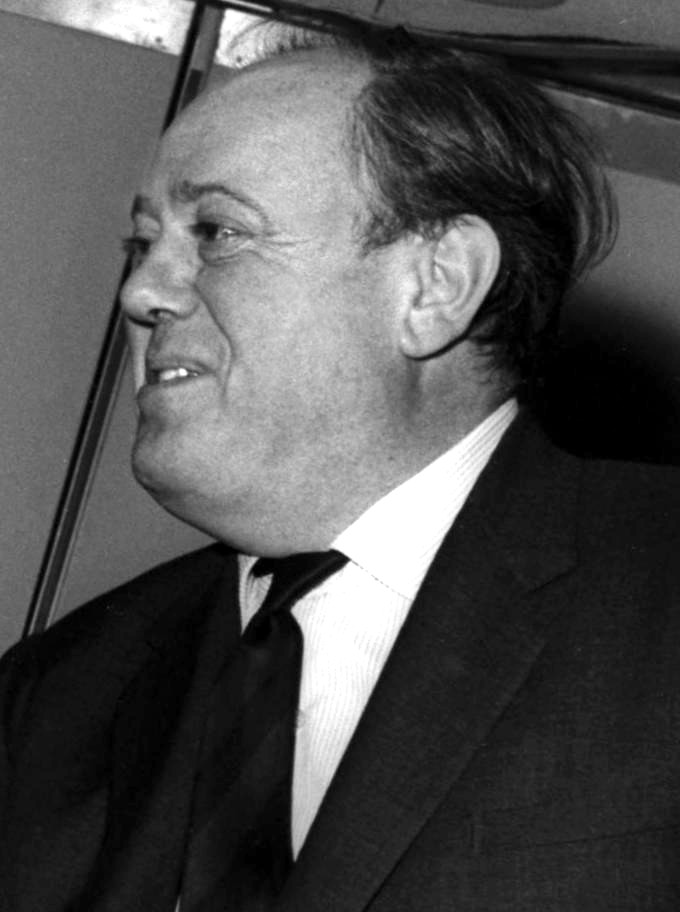
- Soames in 1966

Governor of Southern Rhodesia
- In office 11 December 1979 – 18 April 1980
- Monarch: Elizabeth II
- Preceded by: Humphrey Gibbs (Note: Humphrey Gibbs' position as governor was abolished by the government of Rhodesia in 1965, but the abolition was unrecognised and Gibbs still legally held office until 1969) as Governor of Southern Rhodesia; Josiah Zion Gumede (Note: Josiah Zion Gumede was head of state of the internationally unrecognised government of Zimbabwe Rhodesia, which was formed following the Internal Settlement of 1978) as President of Zimbabwe Rhodesia
- Succeeded by: Canaan Banana as President of Zimbabwe

Vice-President of the European Commission
- In office 6 January 1973 – 5 January 1977
- President: François-Xavier Ortoli

European Commissioner for External Relations
- In office 6 January 1973 – 5 January 1977
- President: François-Xavier Ortoli
- Preceded by: Jean-François Deniau
- Succeeded by: Wilhelm Haferkamp

Her Majesty's Ambassador to France
- In office September 1968 – 27 October 1972
- Preceded by: Patrick Reilly
- Succeeded by: Edward Tomkins
Ministerial offices
Leader of the House of Lords and Lord President of the Council
In office 5 May 1979 – 14 September 1981
Prime Minister	Margaret Thatcher
Preceded by	The Lord Peart (Lords); Michael Foot (Council)
Succeeded by	The Baroness Young (Lords); Francis Pym (Council)
Shadow Foreign Secretary
In office 4 August 1965 – 13 April 1966
Leader	Edward Heath
Preceded by	Reginald Maudling
Succeeded by	Alec Douglas-Home
Shadow Secretary of State for Defence
In office 16 February 1965 – 4 August 1965
Leader	Alec Douglas-Home
Preceded by	Peter Thorneycroft
Succeeded by	Enoch Powell
Shadow Minister of Agriculture, Fisheries and Food
In office 16 October 1964 – 16 February 1965
Leader	Alec Douglas-Home
Preceded by	Fred Peart
Succeeded by	Martin Redmayne
Minister of Agriculture, Fisheries and Food
In office 27 July 1960 – 16 October 1964
Prime Minister	Harold Macmillan; Alec Douglas-Home
Preceded by	John Hare
Succeeded by	Fred Peart
Secretary of State for War
In office 6 January 1958 – 27 July 1960
Prime Minister	Harold Macmillan
Preceded by	John Hare
Succeeded by	John Profumo
Parliamentary and Financial Secretary to the Admiralty
In office 9 January 1957 – 6 January 1958
Prime Minister	Harold Macmillan
Preceded by	George Ward
Succeeded by	Robert Allan
Parliamentary Under-Secretary of State for Air
In office 6 April 1955 – 9 January 1957
Prime Minister	Anthony Eden
Preceded by	George Ward
Succeeded by	Ian Orr-Ewing
Parliamentary offices
Member of the House of Lords
Lord Temporal
Life peerage 19 April 1978 – 16 September 1987
Member of Parliament for Bedford
In office 23 February 1950 – 10 March 1966
Preceded by	Thomas Skeffington-Lodge
Succeeded by	Brian Parkyn

Personal details
- Born: Arthur Christopher John Soames; 12 October 1920 Penn, Buckinghamshire, England
- Died: 16 September 1987 (aged 66) Odiham, Hampshire, England
- Resting place: St Martin's Church, Bladon
- Party: Conservative
- Spouse: Mary Churchill (m. 1947)
- Children: 5, including Nicholas and Rupert
- Parent: Arthur Granville Soames (father)
- Relatives: Winston Churchill (father‑in‑law)
- Education: Eton College; Royal Military College, Sandhurst

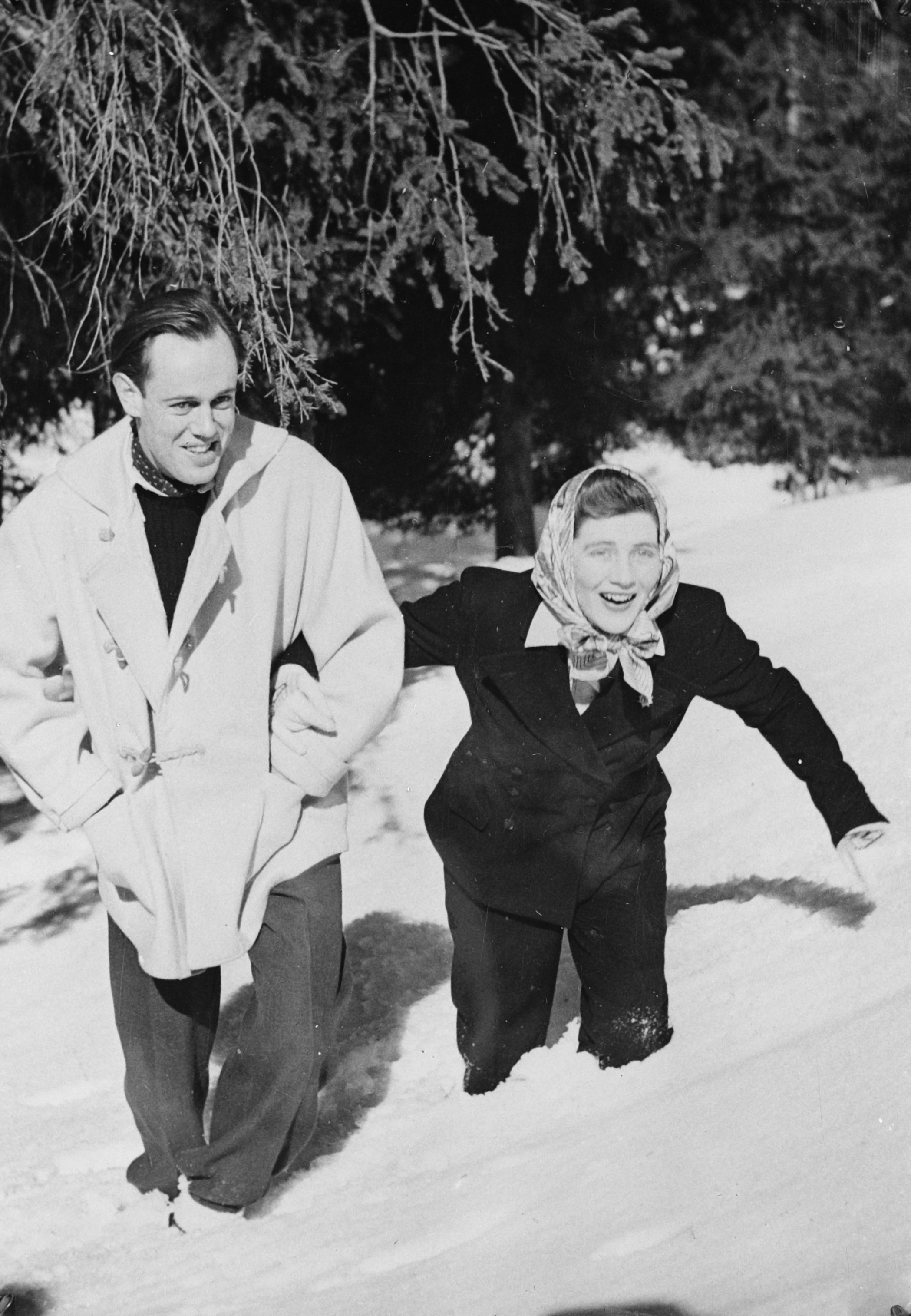
Christopher and Mary Soames in Lenzerheide, February 1947

Arthur Christopher John Soames, Baron Soames, GCMG, GCVO, CH, CBE, PC (12 October 1920 – 16 September 1987) was a British Conservative politician who served as a European Commissioner and the last Governor of Southern Rhodesia. He was previously Member of Parliament (MP) for Bedford from 1950 to 1966. He held several government posts and attained Cabinet rank.

== Early life and education ==
Soames was born in Penn, Buckinghamshire, England, the son of Captain Arthur Granville Soames (the brother of Olave Baden-Powell, World Chief Guide, both descendants of a brewing family who had joined the landed gentry) by his marriage to Hope Mary Woodbine Parish. His parents divorced while he was a boy, and his mother married her second husband Charles Rhys (later 8th Baron Dynevor), by whom she had further children including Richard Rhys, 9th Baron Dynevor.

Soames was educated at West Downs School, Eton College, and the Royal Military College at Sandhurst. He obtained a commission as an officer in the Coldstream Guards just before the Second World War broke out. During the war he served in France, Italy and North Africa, and was awarded the French Croix de Guerre for his actions at the Second Battle of El Alamein in 1942.

== Political career ==
After military service during the Second World War, Soames served as the Assistant Military Attaché in Paris. He was the Conservative MP for Bedford from 1950 to 1966 and served under Anthony Eden as Under-Secretary of State for Air from 1955 to 1957 and under Harold Macmillan as Parliamentary and Financial Secretary to the Admiralty from 1957 to 1958. In the 1955 Birthday Honours, he was invested as Commander of the Order of the British Empire (CBE).

In 1958 he was sworn of the Privy Council. He served under Macmillan as Secretary of State for War (outside the Cabinet) from 1958 to 1960 and then in the cabinets of Macmillan and his successor Alec Douglas-Home as Minister of Agriculture, Fisheries and Food from July 1960 to 1964. Home had promised to promote him to Foreign Secretary if the Conservatives won the 1964 general election, but they did not.

Between 1965 and 1966, Soames was Shadow Foreign Secretary under Edward Heath. He lost his seat in Parliament in the 1966 election. In 1968 Harold Wilson appointed him Ambassador to France, where he served until 1972. During his tenure as ambassador, he was involved in the February 1969 "Soames affair", following a private meeting between Soames and French president Charles de Gaulle, the latter offering bilateral talks concerning a partnership for Britain in a larger and looser European union, the talks not involving other members. The British government eventually refused the offer, and that for a time strained Franco-British relations. He was then a Vice-President of the European Commission from 1973 to 1976. He was considered as a potential challenger to Edward Heath in the 1975 Conservative Party leadership election. The eventual winner Margaret Thatcher would have withdrawn if he had stood. He was created a life peer on 19 April 1978 as Baron Soames, of Fletching in the County of East Sussex.

He served as the interim governor of Southern Rhodesia from 1979 to 1980, charged with administering the terms of the Lancaster House Agreement and overseeing its transition to internationally recognised independence as Zimbabwe in 1980. From 1979 to 1981, he was Lord President of the Council and Leader of the House of Lords under Margaret Thatcher, concurrent with his duties in Southern Rhodesia. Soames arrived in Salisbury on 12 December 1979, the day after the passage of the Zimbabwe Act 1979, which formally ended Rhodesia's 14-year Unilateral Declaration of Independence and restored British authority. On 21 December 1979, he signed proclamations lifting the ban on ZANU-PF and the Zimbabwe African People's Union and granting a general amnesty to all who had taken up arms in the war. He oversaw the deployment of approximately 1,200 Commonwealth monitoring troops drawn from Britain, Australia, Fiji, New Zealand and Kenya, who supervised the ceasefire and the assembly of guerrilla forces at 16 designated assembly points across the country. The elections were held between 14 and 21 February 1980 amid widespread violence and allegations of voter intimidation, which generated controversy over Soames's decision not to disqualify ZANU-PF from the poll. ZANU-PF led by Robert Mugabe won the election, and Zimbabwe achieved internationally recognised independence on 18 April 1980, ending Soames's 129-day governorship, the last in the territory's history.

== Outside politics ==
Soames served as president of the Royal Agricultural Society of England in 1973, and was a non-executive director of N.M. Rothschild and Sons Ltd from 1977 to 1979, and a director of the Nat West Bank from 1978 to 1979.

== Personal life ==
Soames married Mary Churchill, the youngest child of Winston and Clementine Churchill, on 11 February 1947. They had five children:

- Arthur Nicholas Winston Soames, Baron Soames of Fletching (b. 12 February 1948), Member of House of Lords, former Conservative MP and Shadow Secretary of State for Defence;
- Emma Mary Soames (b. 6 September 1949), editor of Saga magazine;
- Jeremy Bernard Soames (b. 25 May 1952);
- Charlotte Clementine Soames, Countess Peel (b. 17 July 1954), married to William Peel, 3rd Earl Peel, former Lord Chamberlain;
- Rupert Christopher Soames (b. 18 May 1959).

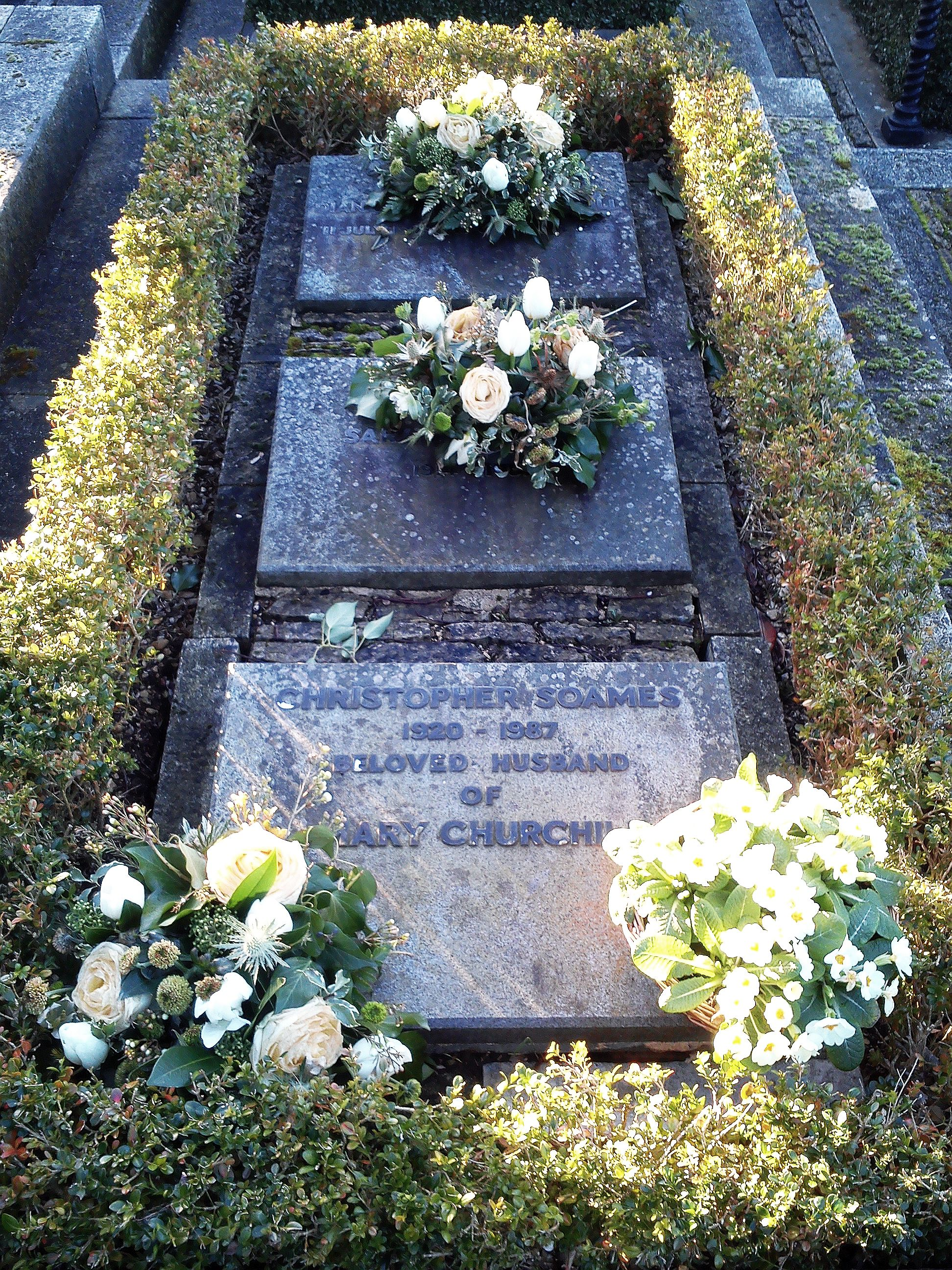
Christopher and Mary Soames' grave at St Martin's Church, Bladon, in 2015

Lord Soames died from cancer at his home in Odiham on 16 September 1987. His ashes were buried within the Churchill plot at St Martin's Church, Bladon, near Woodstock, Oxfordshire.

== Honours ==
In date order:

- Croix de Guerre 1939–1945 (France) – 1942
- Commander of the Order of the British Empire (CBE) (Civil division) – 1955
- Knight Grand Cross of the Order of St Michael and St George (GCMG) – 1972
- Knight Grand Cross of the Royal Victorian Order (GCVO) – 1972
- Grand Officer of the Legion of Honour (France) – 1972
- Robert Schuman Prize – 1976
- Member of the Order of the Companions of Honour (CH) – 1980 Birthday Honours

== Arms ==
Coat of arms of Christopher Soames
Crest In front of a rising sun Proper upon a lure Gules feathered Argent fesswise a falcon belled Or. Escutcheon Gules a chevron Or between in chief two mallets erect of the second and in base two wings conjoined in lure Argent. Motto Vilius Virtutibus Aurum

== Bibliography ==
- Campbell, John (2010). Pistols at Dawn: Two Hundred Years of Political Rivalry from Pitt and Fox to Blair and Brown. London: Vintage. ISBN 978-1-84595-091-0. OCLC 489636152.
- Jago, Michael (2015). Rab Butler: The Best Prime Minister We Never Had?. London: Biteback. ISBN 978-1-84954-920-2.
- Mosley, Nicholas, ed. (1982). Debrett's Handbook 1982: Distinguished People in British Life. London: Debrett's Peerage Limited. ISBN 978-0-905649-38-2.
- Sanderson, Claire (2011). Perfide Albion? L'affaire Soames et les arcanes de la diplomatie britannique (in French). Paris: Publications de la Sorbonne. ISBN 978-2-85944-665-9.

Parliament of the United Kingdom
Preceded by Tom Skeffington-Lodge	Member of Parliament for Bedford; 1950–1966	Succeeded by Brian Parkyn
Political offices
Preceded by George Ward	Undersecretary of State for Air; 1955–1957	Succeeded by Ian Orr-Ewing
Preceded by George Ward	Secretary to the Admiralty; 1957–1958	Succeeded by Robert Allan
Preceded by John Hare	Secretary of State for War; 1958–1960	Succeeded by John Profumo
Preceded by John Hare	Minister of State for Agriculture, Fisheries and Food; 1960–1964	Succeeded by Fred Peart
Preceded by Reginald Maudling	Shadow Foreign Secretary; 1965–1966	Succeeded by Alec Douglas-Home
New office	European Commissioner from the United Kingdom; 1973–1977; Served alongside: George Thomson	Succeeded by Christopher Tugendhat
New office	European Commissioner from the United Kingdom; 1973–1977; Served alongside: George Thomson	Succeeded by Roy Jenkins
Preceded by Jean-François Deniau	European Commissioner for External Relations; 1973–1977	Succeeded by Wilhelm Haferkamp
Preceded by Ralf Dahrendorf	European Commissioner for Trade; 1973–1977	Succeeded by Wilhelm Haferkamp
Preceded by The Lord Peart	Leader of the House of Lords; 1979–1981	Succeeded by The Baroness Young
Preceded by Michael Foot	Lord President of the Council; 1979–1981	Succeeded by Francis Pym
Preceded by Humphrey Gibbs	Governor of Southern Rhodesia; 1979–1980	Succeeded by Canaan Banana as President of Zimbabwe
Party political offices
Preceded by The Lord Carrington	Leader of the Conservative Party in the House of Lords; 1979–1981	Succeeded by The Baroness Young
Diplomatic posts
Preceded by Patrick Reilly	British Ambassador to France; 1968–1972	Succeeded by Edward Tomkins
