= Vivienne (photographer) =

British photographer and singer

Florence Vivienne Mellish (1889–1982), known simply as Vivienne, was a British photographer and singer.

She was married to the artist Ernest George Entwistle (1877–1963), and took up photography in 1934, in order to assist him and their photographer son, Antony Beauchamp, (pronounced Beecham). Another son, Clive Entwistle, was an architect and civil engineer.

Her autobiography, They Came to My Studio: Famous People of Our Time was published in 1956.

She appeared as a castaway on the BBC Radio programme Desert Island Discs on 22 July 1963.

208 of her works are in the National Portrait Gallery, as is one photograph of her, and works by Beauchamp.

== Bibliography ==
- They Came to My Studio: Famous People of Our Time. Hall Publications. 1956.
