= Aid to Russia Fund =

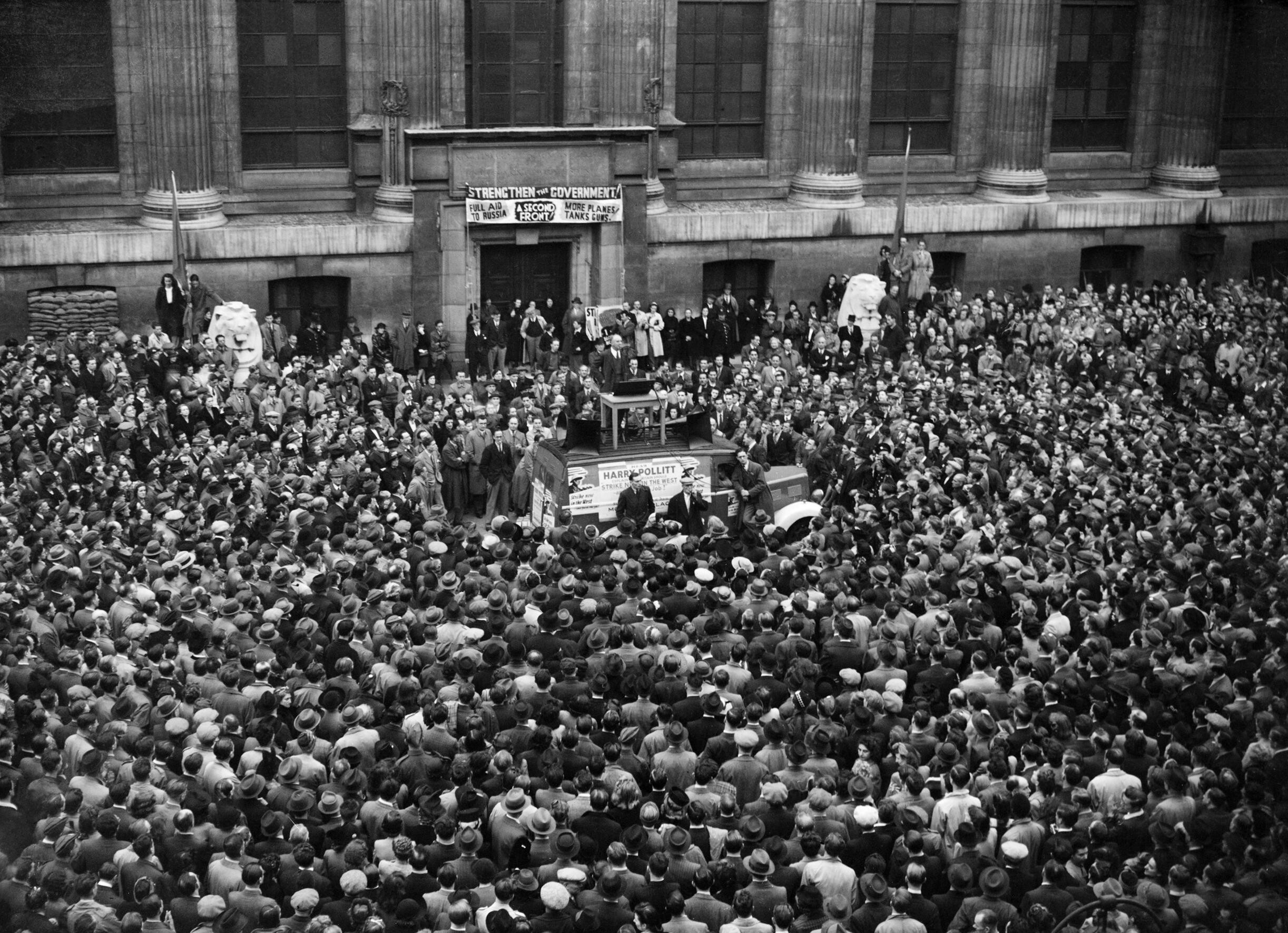
A huge crowd gathered outside the British Museum, to hear Harry Pollitt, the General Secretary of the Communist Party of Great Britain (CPGB), make a speech about the Aid to Russia Fund, 1941

The Aid to Russia Fund (Russian: Фонд помощи России) was founded in 1941 by the Joint War Organisation to assist Russians cope with the deprivations caused by Hitler's advance. Mrs Clementine Churchill was appointed chairman.

Around £8 million was raised over the course of the war, including £1000 that was donated in the first week by King George and Queen Elizabeth. The Penny-a-Week Fund allowed citizens of the UK to contribute whatever they could, with the scheme being introduced in 1939. It deducted a penny from the weekly salaries of about 1,400,000 employees in 15,000 firms. The money raised helped pay for warm clothing and medical supplies. Proceeds from football events were donated to the fund, including the England vs Scotland game held at Wembley in January 1942, and an England vs Wales match held in February 1943.

The Joint War Organisation worked with the Trades Union Congress, the National Council of Labour and the Mineworkers Federation to provide supplies. Within 14 months of the fund's establishment, portable X-ray units, medications, clothing, and surgical instruments were sent to Russia.

In 1945, Clementine Churchill visited Russia to see the impact the fund had made and was awarded the Order of the Red Banner of Labour by Stalin.

The fund ceased seeking active collections in 1945, with the charity having raised around £7.5 million in June 1947.
