= Antony Beauchamp =

British photographer and second husband of Sarah Churchill (1918-1957)

Antony Roger Beauchamp Entwistle (1918 – 18 August 1957) was a British photographer, and the second husband of Sarah Churchill.

He was the son of the artist Ernest Entwistle and his wife, fellow photographer Vivienne. He started his photography career remote working in his family house as Antony Roger using his first two names in the 1930s before adopting a combination of his other names Antony Beauchamp.

In the Second World War, he served as an official war artist in Burma.

Beauchamp photographed celebrities including Marilyn Monroe, Vivien Leigh, Audrey Hepburn, and Charlie Chaplin.

In 1949, he married the actress Sarah Churchill, daughter of Sir Winston Churchill, and moved to Los Angeles. He killed himself on 18 August 1957, taking a barbiturate overdose at his flat in Hyde Park Gardens, Westminster.
