= St Martin's Church, Bladon =

Church in Baldon, England

Coordinates: 51°49′49″N 1°20′59″W

St Martin's Parish Church
- Parish Church of Saint Martin, Bladon
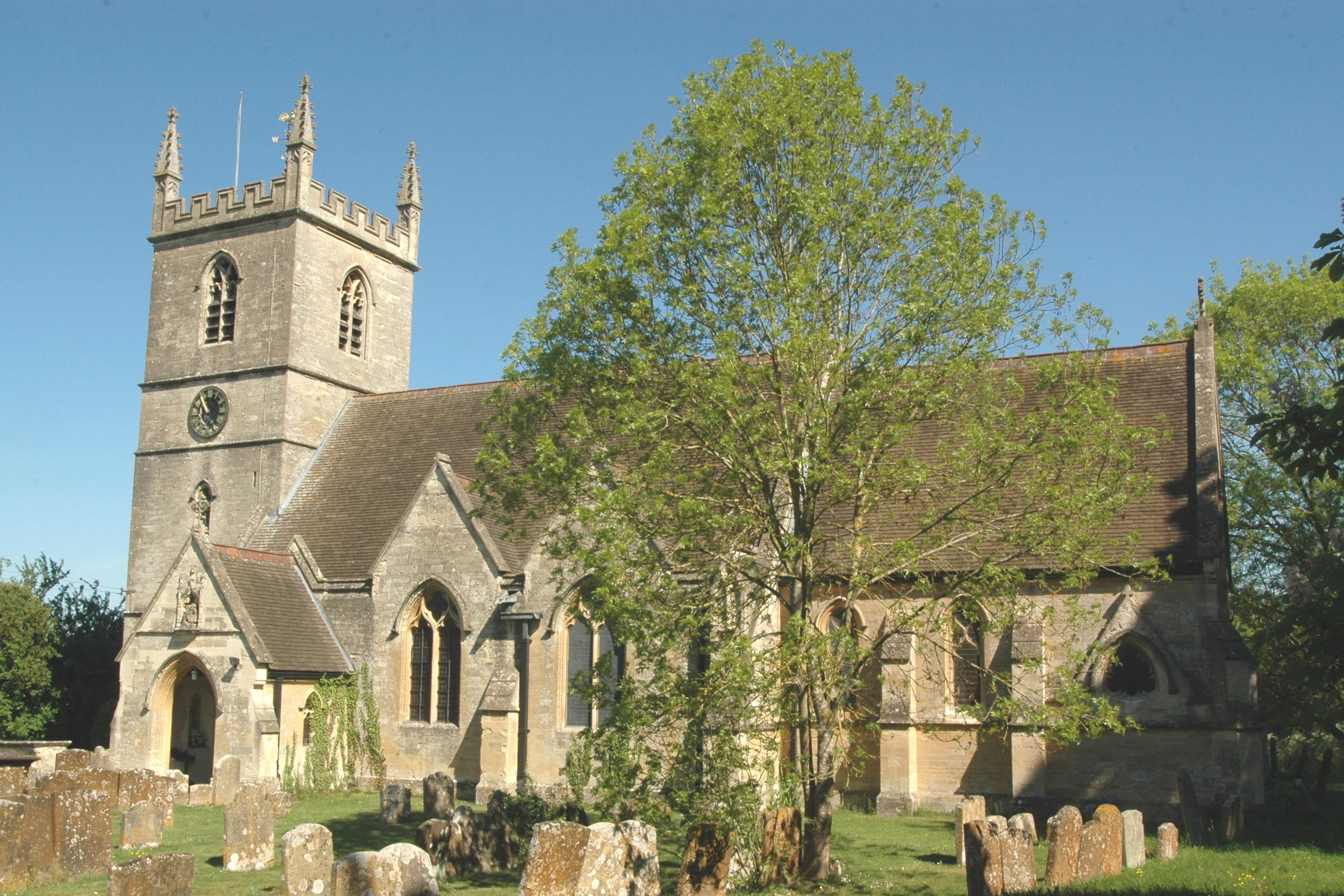
- St Martin's Parish Church
- St Martin's Parish Church
- OS grid reference: SP 44907 14828
- Location: Church Street, Bladon, Woodstock, Oxfordshire, England
- Country: England
- Denomination: Church of England
- Website: woodstockandbladon.com/churches/bladon

History
- Dedication: Saint Martin

Architecture
- Years built: 1891

Administration
- Diocese: Oxford

Clergy
- Rector: The Very Reverend Jeremy Auld

St Martin's Church in Bladon near Woodstock, Oxfordshire, England, is the Church of England parish church of Bladon-with-Woodstock. It is also the mother church of St Mary Magdalene at Woodstock, which was originally a chapel of ease. It is best known for the graves of the Spencer-Churchill family, including Sir Winston Churchill, in its churchyard.

== History ==
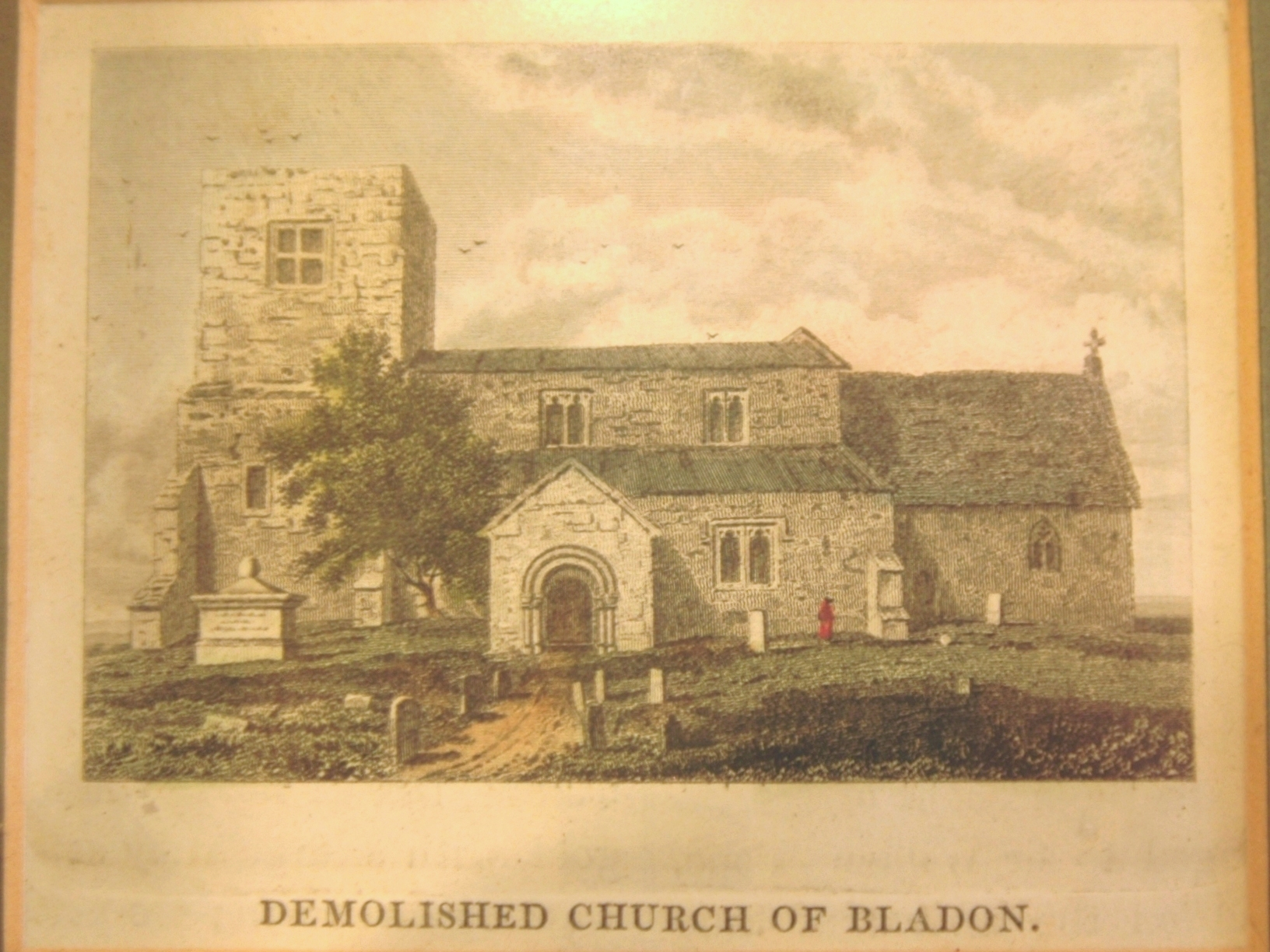
Old St Martin's church, demolished in 1802

The first church on the current site was probably built in the 11th or 12th century. The earliest references to the church state that John de London, Henry III's chaplain, obtained from the King a grant of the Manor of Bladon, with the advowson of the Rectory in 1269.

A print hung in the present St Martin's shows the old church before its demolition in 1802. This print shows an ornate Norman doorway to the south porch, which suggests a 12th or late 11th century date for the building. It also shows a clerestory that would have increased the amount of natural light in the nave.

The parish registers of baptisms, marriages and burials date from 1545 and are kept at the Bodleian Library in Oxford.

There is no surviving record of the church's building until 1802, when the parish petitioned John Randolph, Bishop of Oxford, to grant them a new building as the old one was becoming dilapidated and dangerous. Permission was granted, the medieval church was demolished, the 4th Duke of Marlborough paid for building materials and the new church was opened in 1804.

In 1891 the architect A.W. Blomfield rebuilt the chancel, restored the nave, added new windows and added pinnacles on the tower. Unlike the medieval church, the new building has no clerestory and despite the windows that Blomfield added the interior remains relatively dark.

The work was carried out largely at the expense of the rector, Arthur Majendie, and resulted in the creation of the present church. Because of these efforts, three windows in the chancel are dedicated to his memory by his widow and children. Other feature windows in the church include a copy of Sir Joshua Reynolds' Choir of the Cherubs. In 1893, Majendie gave a lych gate in memory of his mother. In 1937, a statue of Saint Martin was placed in a niche over the porch.

== Spencer-Churchill graves ==
The parish of St Martin's includes Blenheim Palace, the family seat of the dukes of Marlborough. Members of the Spencer-Churchill family are interred in St Martin's parish churchyard at Bladon. With the exception of the 10th Duke and his first wife, the dukes and duchesses of Marlborough are buried in the Blenheim Palace's chapel.

Sir Winston Churchill had expressed a wish to be buried at Bladon. Accordingly, on 30 January 1965, after his state funeral service at St Paul's Cathedral, London, his body was taken by train to nearby Hanborough railway station and thence to Bladon. There, the private burial took place, conducted by the rector. By contrast with the earlier service, only relatives and close friends were present. In 1977, the body of his wife, Clementine Churchill, was buried with her husband's, in the same tomb.

In 1998, Churchill's tombstone had to be replaced because of the large number of visitors over the years having eroded it and its surrounding area. A new stone was dedicated in a ceremony attended by members of the Spencer-Churchill family. However, after only eight years the gravestone had become dirty and partially eroded again. In July 2006 the area of the graveyard containing Churchill's grave was closed to visitors and a cleaning and restoration project restored the gravestone.

The churchyard also contains the graves of Sir Winston Churchill's parents Lord Randolph Churchill and Jennie Jerome, his younger brother John, his children Diana, Randolph, Sarah, and Mary, his son-in-law Christopher Soames, Baron Soames, and his grandson Winston Churchill. Sir Winston Churchill's daughter Marigold who died of sepsis of the throat in 1921 was originally buried in Kensal Green Cemetery before being re-interred at Bladon in 2020. Other Churchill family members buried there include the 10th Duke of Marlborough along with his first wife Mary Cadogan and his mother, Consuelo Vanderbilt, a former Duchess of Marlborough through her marriage to the 9th Duke of Marlborough, and their younger son Lord Ivor Spencer-Churchill.

The churchyard is the subject of the poem "At Bladon", by Avril Anderson (also known as Mrs Crabtree), which was read on the air as part of the BBC's broadcast of Winston Churchill's funeral.

== Gallery ==
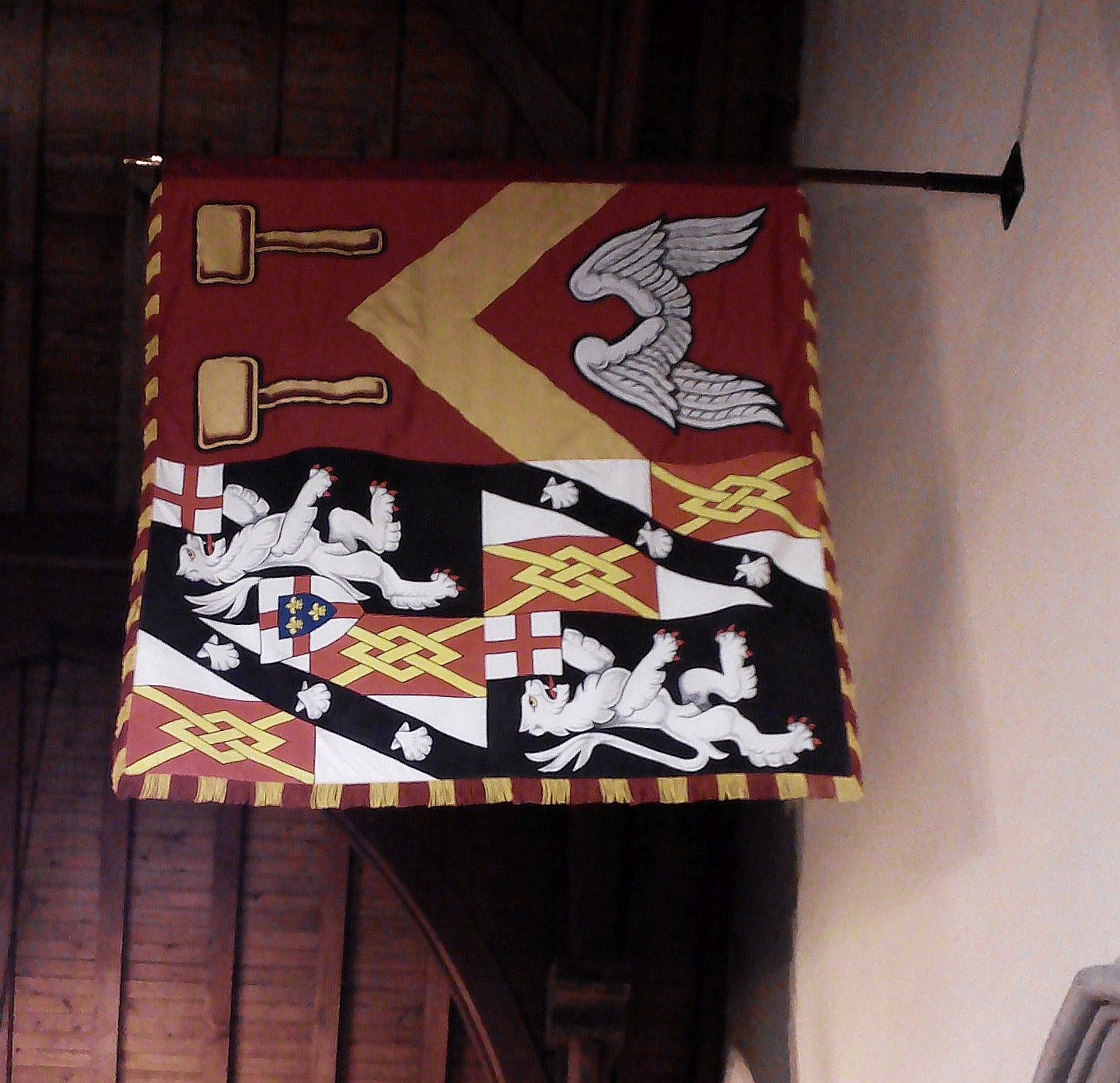
Lady Soames' Garter banner at St Martin's Church

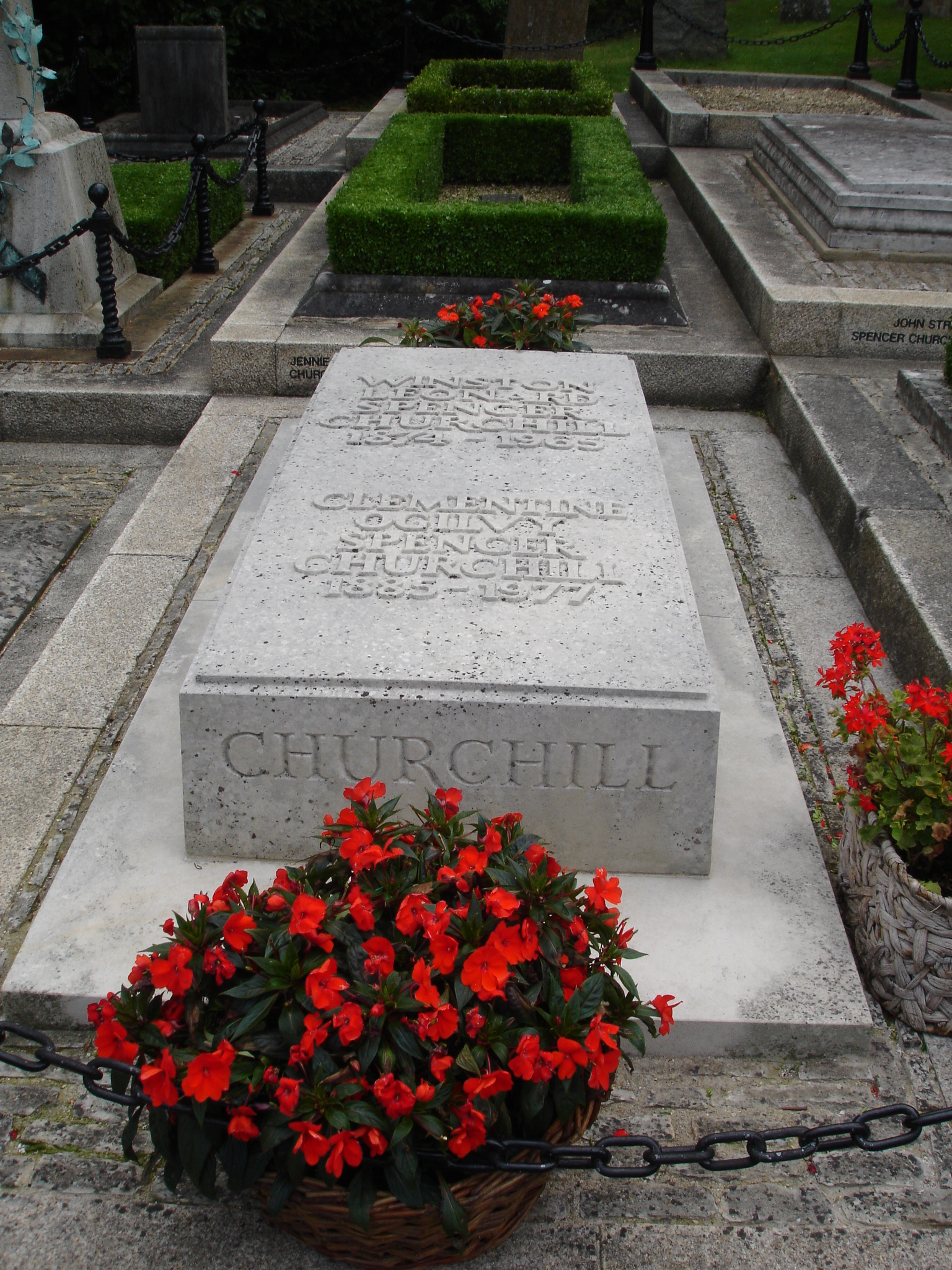
Winston and Clementine Churchill's grave after restoration in 2006

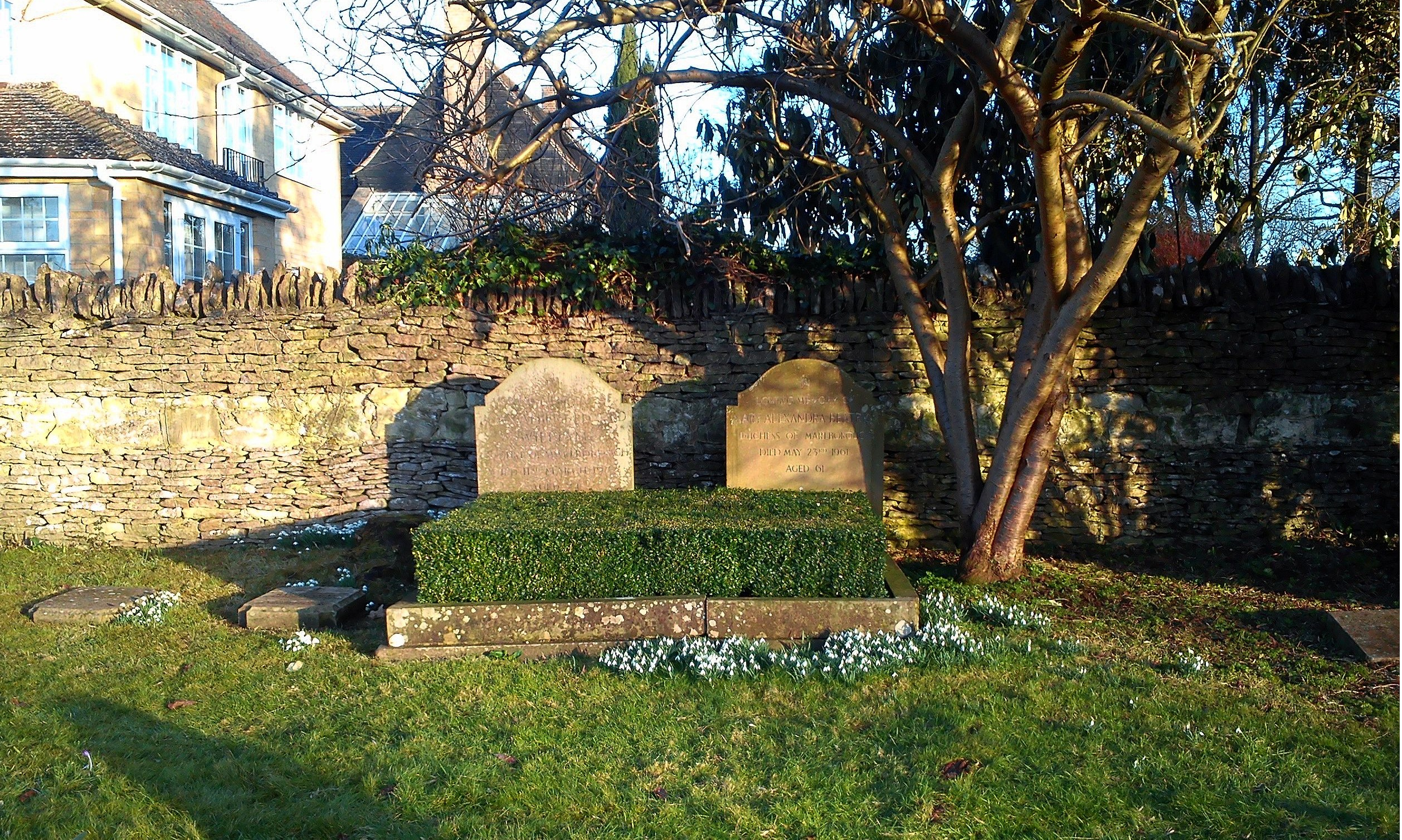
The grave of the 10th Duke of Marlborough and his first wife at St Martin's Church

== Sources and further reading ==
- Crossley, Alan; Baggs, A.P.; Blair, W.J.; Chance, Eleanor; Colvin, Christina; Cooper, Janet; Day, C.J.; Selwyn, Nesta; Townley, Simon C. (1990). Elrington, C.R. (ed.). A History of the County of Oxford, Volume 12: Wootton Hundred (South) including Woodstock. Victoria County History. pp. 31–34.
- Sherwood, Jennifer; Pevsner, Nikolaus (1974). Oxfordshire. The Buildings of England. Harmondsworth: Penguin Books. p. 459. ISBN 0-14-071045-0.
