= Sarah Churchill (actress) =

English actress and dancer (1914–1982)

The Right Honourable The Lady Audley
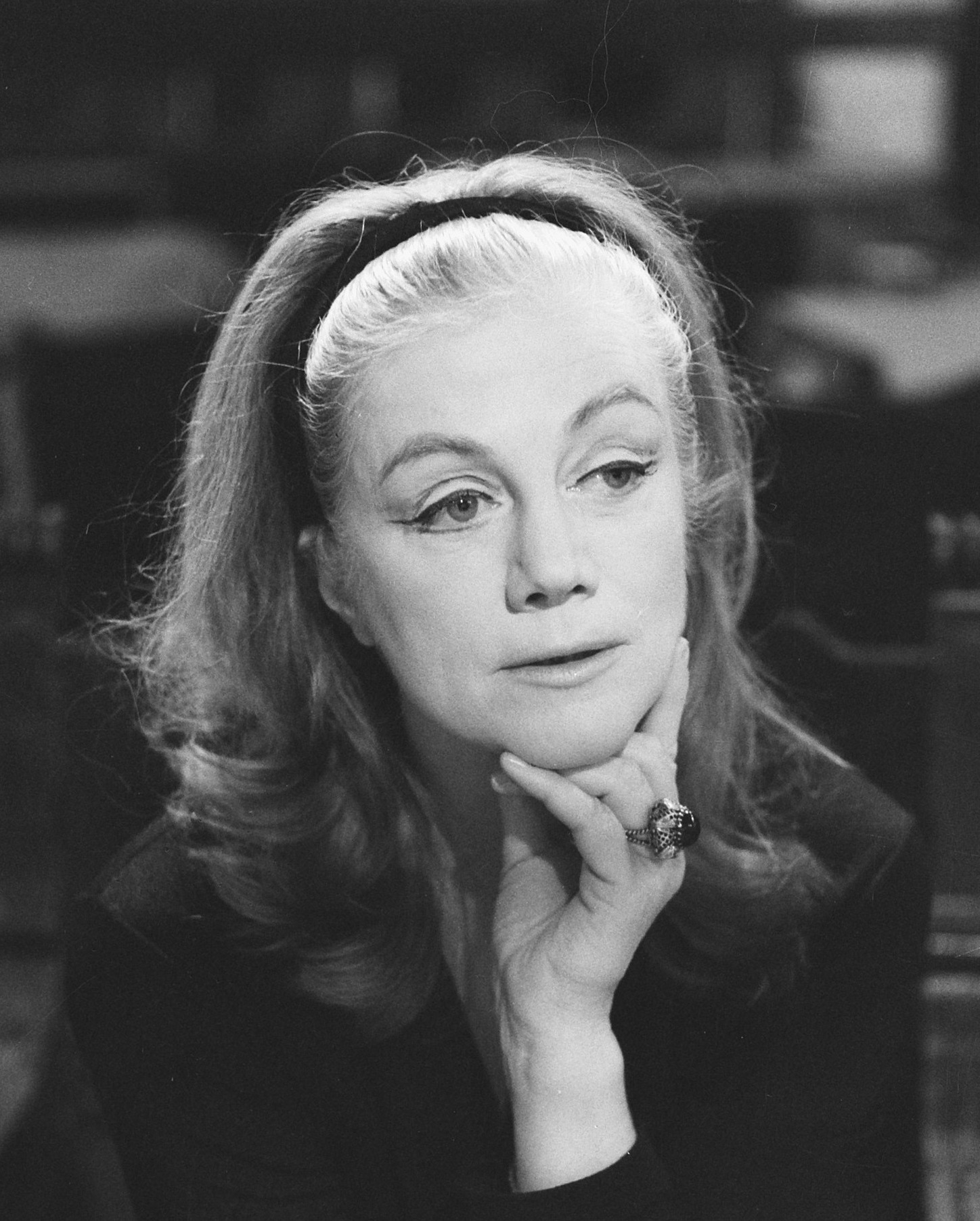
- Churchill in 1966
- Born: Sarah Millicent Hermione Spencer-Churchill; 7 October 1914; London, England
- Died: 24 September 1982 (aged 67); London, England
- Buried: St Martin's Church, Bladon
- Noble family: Spencer-Churchill
- Spouses: Vic Oliver (m. 1936; div. 1945); Antony Beauchamp (m. 1949; died 1957); Thomas Touchet-Jesson, 23rd Baron Audley (m. 1962; died 1963)
- Parents: Winston Churchill; Clementine Hozier

Sarah Millicent Hermione Touchet-Jesson, Baroness Audley (née Spencer-Churchill; (Note: This English person has the double-barrelled surname Spencer-Churchill, but is known by the surname Churchill.) 7 October 1914 – 24 September 1982), was an English actress and dancer and a daughter of Winston Churchill.

== Early life ==
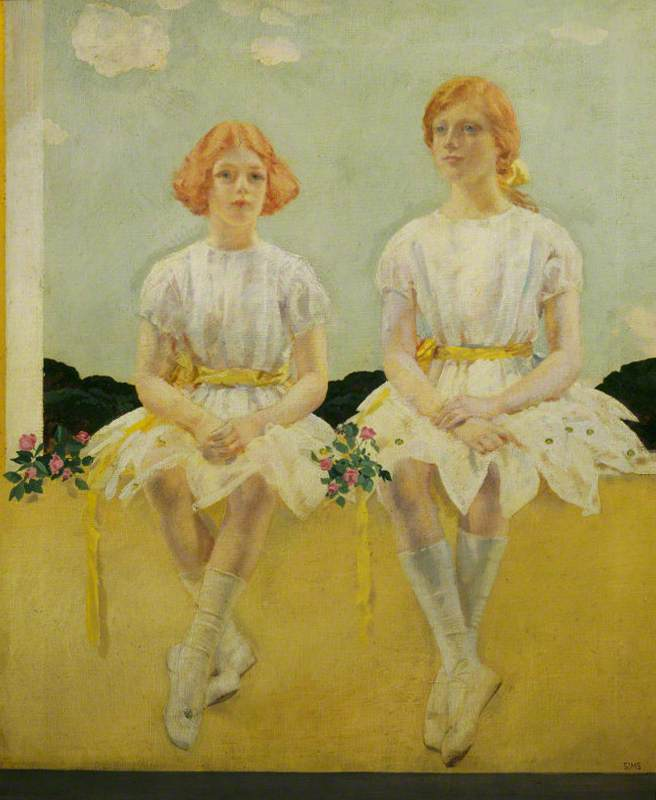
Charles Sims, Two Girls Seated: Diana and Sarah Churchill, 1922, National Trust, Chartwell.

Sarah Churchill was born in London, the second daughter of Winston Churchill, later Prime Minister from 1940 to 1945 and again from 1951 to 1955, and Clementine Churchill, later Baroness Spencer-Churchill; she was the third of the couple's five children and was named after Sir Winston's ancestor, Sarah Churchill, Duchess of Marlborough. She was educated at Notting Hill High School as a day girl and later at North Foreland Lodge as a boarder.

== Personal life ==
Churchill married three times:

1. Vic Oliver, born Victor Oliver von Samek, a popular comedian and musician (1936–1945) (divorced)
2. Antony Beauchamp (1949–1957) (widowed)
3. Thomas Percy Henry Touchet-Jesson, 23rd Baron Audley (1962–1963) (widowed)

It has been both stated and confirmed by multiple sources, including Sarah Churchill's sister, Lady Soames, that Winston and Clementine Churchill neither liked nor approved of Sarah's first two husbands. Towards the end of her marriage to Vic Oliver, she began an affair with the American ambassador to Britain, John Winant; it is believed the failure of the relationship contributed to the depression that led to Winant's suicide in 1947. Only Sarah's third marriage to Lord Audley (the love of her life, it was said) was greeted with warm approval by both parents.

In 1964 Churchill became romantically involved with African-American emigrated jazz singer and painter, Lobo Nocho, and there were reports that the two might marry. Her father was also believed to have disapproved of this relationship.

== Second World War service ==
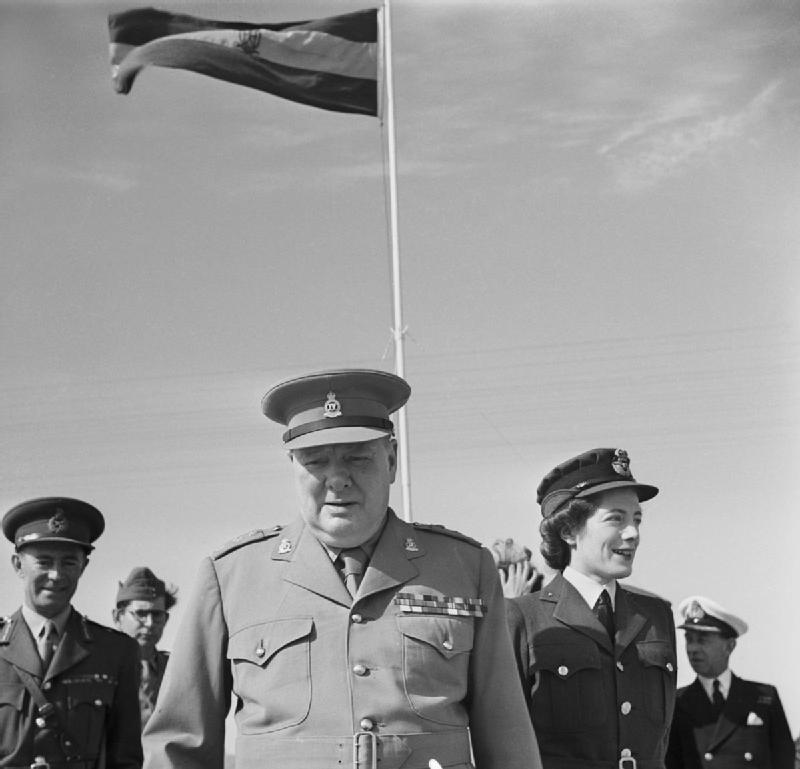
Winston Churchill is accompanied by his daughter Sarah, in Cairo, December 1943

During the Second World War, Churchill joined the Women's Auxiliary Air Force (WAAF). In her account of the work of photo reconnaissance Evidence in Camera Constance Babington Smith records that she was with them and worked closely on the interpretation of photographs for the 1942 invasion of North Africa, Operation Torch. Known by the name Sarah Oliver, Babington Smith says she was "a quick and versatile interpreter." Aspects of Churchill's wartime service are also described in detail in Women of Intelligence: Winning the Second World War with Air Photos.

American author Christopher Ogden's biography of Pamela Harriman and other sources indicate that during the war Churchill had an affair with (married) US Ambassador John Gilbert Winant, and that it ended badly. Winant committed suicide in 1947.

Catherine Grace Katz's book, The daughters of Yalta: The Churchills, Roosevelts, and Harrimans: A Story of Family, Love, and War describes Sarah, Kathleen Harriman and Anna Roosevelt Halsted, playing a key role in the Yalta Conference, as they managed their temperamental fathers.

== Acting career ==
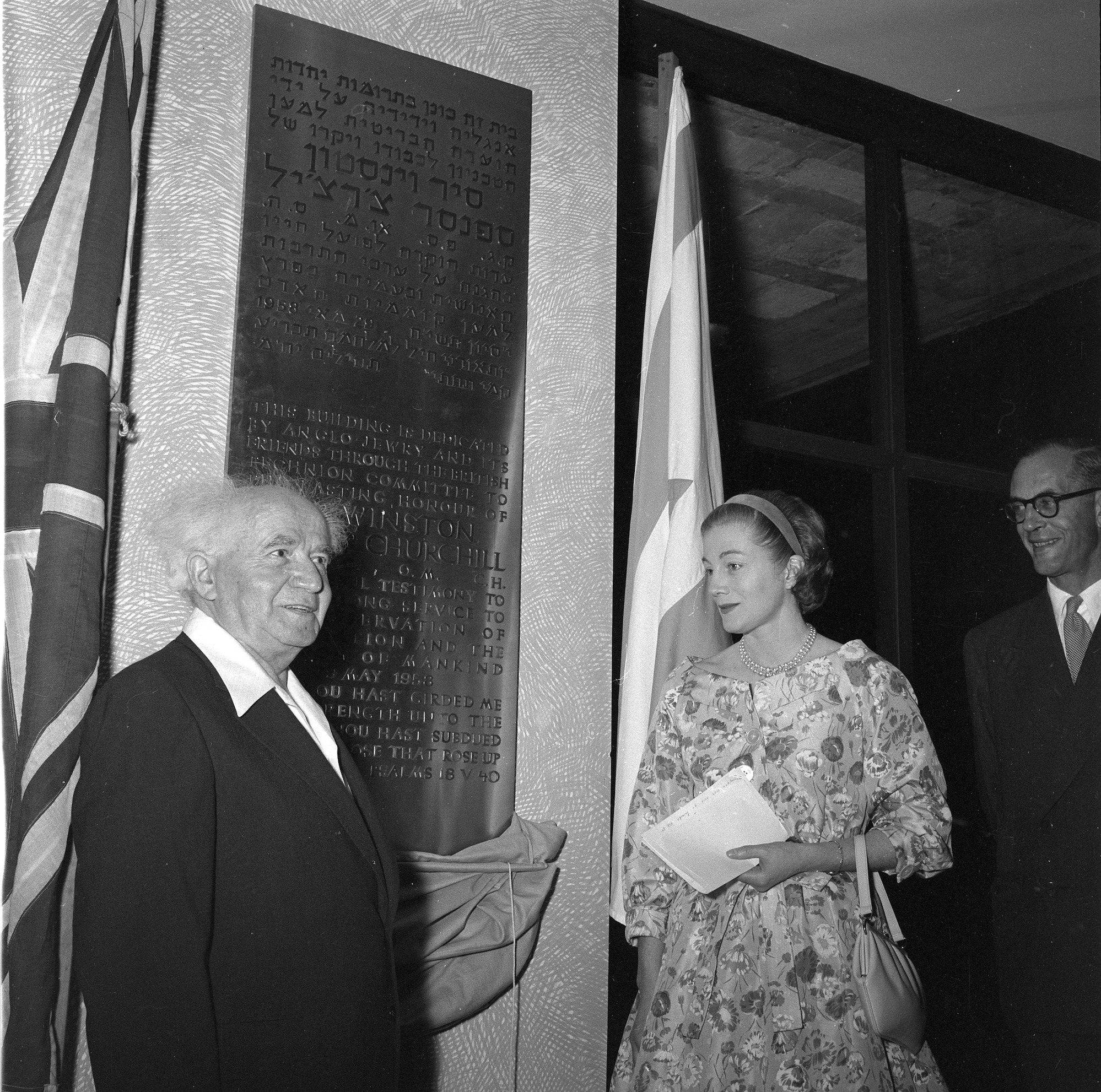
Sarah Churchill with Israeli prime minister David Ben-Gurion during the opening of the Churchill hall in Haifa

Churchill is best known for her role in the film Royal Wedding (1951) as Anne Ashmond, romantic interest of Fred Astaire as Tom Bowen. In the same year, she had her own television show. She also appeared in He Found a Star (1941), Spring Meeting (1941), All Over the Town (1949), Fabian of the Yard (1954) and Serious Charge (1959).

On 17 November 1950, Churchill starred in "Witness for the Prosecution", an episode of the American TV program Danger. She had a talk show on Sunday afternoons on CBS-TV in 1951. A review in Time magazine described it as "a pleasantly informal 15 minutes of conversation and anecdote". She appeared on both the Jack Benny radio and television programmes. On television, she appeared on the episode "How Jack Met Rochester".

In 1960, she appeared as Lisa Grayson in the play "The Night Life of a Virile Potato" by Gloria Russell at the Lyric Theatre, Hammersmith, London.

In 1961, she appeared as Rosalind in William Shakespeare's As You Like It at the Pembroke-in-the-round Theatre in West Croydon. Her parents were noted as paying a surprise visit to watch her performance, which was almost entirely attended by Croydon schoolchildren. Her father, who sat in the front row of an in-the-round performance and so was highly visible throughout, fell asleep.

== Writing ==
- The Empty Spaces, The Poems of Sarah Churchill (1966)
- The Prince with Many Castles and Other Stories (1966)
- A Thread in The Tapestry (Autobiography, 1967)
- The Unwanted Statue and Other Poems (1969)
- Songs (Music and Lyrics, 1974)
- The Collected Poems of Sarah Churchill, with Songs by Some of Her Friends (1974)
- Keep On Dancing (Autobiography, 1981)

In 1980, A Matter of Choice, an LP of Churchill reciting her poems, was released by Argo Records (UK).

== Prints ==
During the course of her life she created several lithographic prints. In the 1950s Churchill produced several prints featuring Malibu, California. Later in the 1970s, Churchill commercially published a collaborative series of portraits of her father, Sir Winston Churchill through Curtis Hooper, entitled "A Visual Philosophy of Sir Winston Churchill". The series was carefully constructed by Churchill to represent her father's great drive. In the series, (28 in total) most of the works were based on famous photographs chosen by Churchill, while one was based on Churchill's drawing of her father. Each work was given an embossed quotation by Sir Winston Churchill and was signed by both Sarah Churchill and artist Curtis Hooper in pencil and pressed with the artists seal. Artist proofs were made available for each work, with a run of no more than 150 artist proofs, per work, also signed by both Sarah Churchill and artist Curtis Hooper in pencil, below the portrait. All artist proofs bore the artist's embossed seal.

== Alcoholism ==
Sarah Churchill appeared in a London revival of Shaw's Pygmalion in the 1950s, but drinking had become a problem. She was arrested for making a scene in the street on a number of occasions and even spent a short spell on remand in Holloway Prison. She wrote frankly about this in her 1981 autobiography Keep on Dancing.

== Death and interment ==
Sarah Churchill died on 24 September 1982 at the age of 67. She is buried with her parents and three of her siblings (Marigold had previously been buried in a grave at Kensal Green Cemetery in London) at St Martin's Church, Bladon, near Woodstock, Oxfordshire.

== Filmography ==
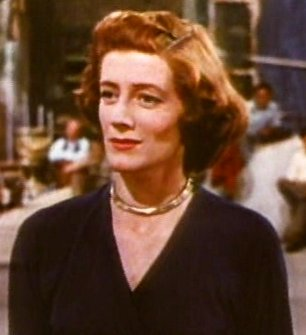
Sarah Churchill in Royal Wedding (1951)

- Who's Your Lady Friend? (1937)
- Spring Meeting (1941)
- He Found a Star (1941)
- Fatal Symphony (1947)
- Daniele Cortis (1947)
- All Over the Town (1949)
- Royal Wedding (1951)
- Fabian of the Yard (1954)
- Serious Charge (1959)

== See also ==
- The Daughters of Yalta (2020) book
- The Churchill Girls (2021) by Rachel Trethewey
