= Clementine Churchill =

Wife of Winston Churchill and life peer (1885–1977)

The Right Honourable The Baroness Spencer-Churchill GBE
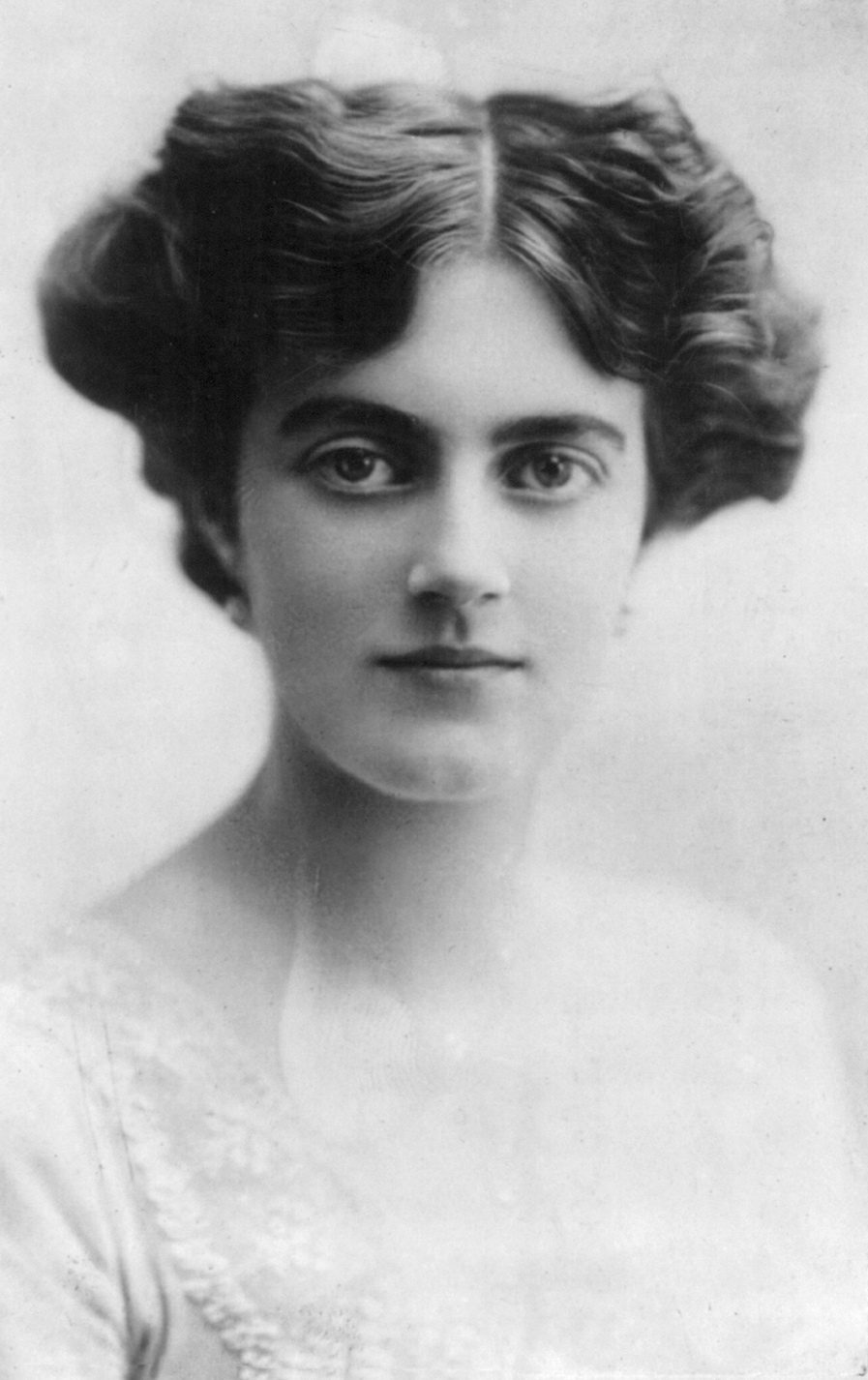
- Spencer-Churchill in 1915

Member of the House of Lords
- Lord Temporal
- In office 17 May 1965 – 12 December 1977 Life peerage

Personal details
- Born: Clementine Ogilvy Hozier; 1 April 1885 London, England
- Died: 12 December 1977 (aged 92) London, England
- Resting place: St Martin's Church, Bladon
- Party: Crossbencher
- Spouse: Winston Churchill (m. 1908; died 1965)
- Children: Diana; Randolph; Sarah; Marigold; Mary

Clementine Ogilvy Spencer-Churchill, Baroness Spencer-Churchill (née Hozier; 1 April 1885 – 12 December 1977), was the wife of Winston Churchill, Prime Minister of the United Kingdom, and a life peer in her own right.

Clementine met Churchill in 1904 and they began their marriage of 56 years in 1908. They had five children together, one of whom (named Marigold) died aged two from sepsis. During the First World War, Clementine organised canteens for munitions workers and during the Second World War, she acted as Chairman of the Red Cross Aid to Russia Fund, President of the Young Women's Christian Association War Time Appeal and Chairman of Maternity Hospital for the Wives of Officers, Fulmer Chase, South Bucks.

Throughout her life she was granted many titles, the final being a life peerage following the death of her husband in 1965. In her later years, she sold several of her husband's portraits to help support herself financially. She died in her London home aged 92.

== Early life ==
Although legally the daughter of Sir Henry Hozier and Lady Blanche Ogilvy (a daughter of David Ogilvy, 10th Earl of Airlie), her paternity is a subject of debate, as Lady Blanche was well known for infidelity. After Sir Henry found Lady Blanche with a lover in 1891, she managed to avert her husband's suit for divorce because of his own infidelities, and thereafter the couple separated.

Clementine's biographer, Joan Hardwick, has surmised (due in part to Sir Henry Hozier's reputed sterility) that all Lady Blanche's "Hozier" children were actually fathered by her sister's husband, Bertram Freeman-Mitford, 1st Baron Redesdale (1837–1916), who is also known as the grandfather of the famous Mitford sisters. In an interview with Mavis Nicholson in 1977, Diana, Lady Mosley, nee Mitford, openly stated in passing that Clementine was her cousin. While Mitford is considered the most probable candidate, it has also been asserted that Bay Middleton was her father. Whatever her true paternity, Clementine is recorded as being the daughter of Lady Blanche and Sir Henry.

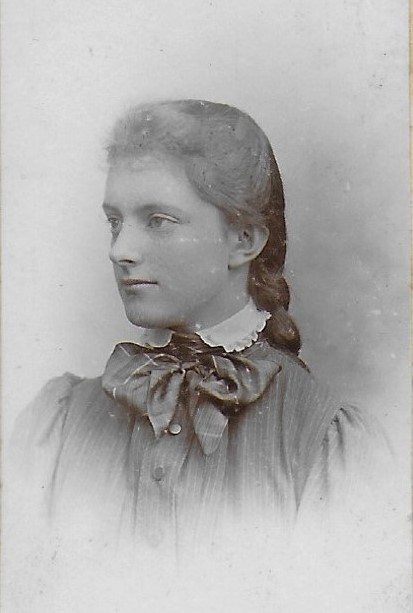
Sister Kitty Ogilvy Hozier in 1899, the year before she died

In the summer of 1899, when Clementine was 14, her mother moved the family to Dieppe, a coastal community in the north of France. There the family spent an idyllic summer, bathing, canoeing, picnicking, and blackberrying. While in Dieppe, the family became well acquainted with 'La Colonie', or the other English inhabitants living by the sea. This group consisted of military men, writers and painters, such as Aubrey Beardsley and Walter Sickert. The latter came to be a great friend of the family.

According to Clementine's daughter, Mary Soames, Clementine was deeply struck by Sickert and thought he was the most handsome and compelling man she had ever seen. The Hoziers' happy life in France ended when Kitty, the eldest daughter, was struck with typhoid fever. Blanche Hozier sent Clementine and her sister Nellie to Scotland so she could devote her time completely to Kitty. Kitty died on 5 March 1900.

Clementine was educated first at home, then briefly at the Edinburgh school run by Karl Fröbel, the nephew of the German educationist, Friedrich Fröbel, and his wife Johanna and later at Berkhamsted School for Girls in Berkhamsted Hertfordshire (The School has now evolved into Berkhamsted School) and at the Sorbonne in Paris. She was twice secretly engaged to Sir Sidney Peel, who had fallen in love with her when she was 18.

== Marriage and children ==
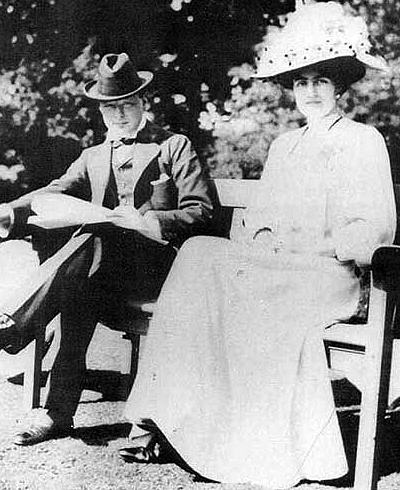
A young Winston Churchill and fiancée Clementine Hozier shortly before their marriage in 1908

Clementine first met Winston Churchill in 1904 at a ball in Crewe Hall, the home of the Earl and Countess of Crewe. In March 1908, they met again when seated side by side at a dinner party hosted by Lady St Helier, a distant relative of Clementine. On their first brief encounter, Winston had recognised Clementine's beauty and distinction; now, after an evening spent in her company, he realised she was a girl of lively intelligence and great character. After five months of meeting each other at social events, as well as frequent correspondence, Winston proposed to Clementine during a house party at Blenheim Palace on 11 August 1908, in a small summer house known as the Temple of Diana.

Winston and Clementine were married on 12 September 1908 in St Margaret's, Westminster. They honeymooned in Baveno, Venice and Veveří Castle in Moravia before settling into a London home at 33 Eccleston Square. They had five children: Diana (1909–1963), Randolph (1911–1968), Sarah (1914–1982), Marigold (1918–1921) and Mary (1922–2014). Only Mary, the youngest, shared their parents' longevity (Marigold died aged two and Diana, Sarah, and Randolph died in their 50s or 60s). The Churchills' marriage was close and affectionate despite the stresses of public life.

== Politician's wife ==
During the First World War, Clementine organised canteens for munitions workers on behalf of YMCA in the North East Metropolitan Area of London, for which she was appointed a Commander of the Order of the British Empire (CBE) in 1918.

Clementine travelled to Dundee in 1922, campaigning on behalf of her husband in the 1922 general election while he was incapacitated after having his appendix removed.

In the 1930s, Clementine travelled without Winston aboard Lord Moyne's yacht, the Rosaura, to exotic islands: Borneo, Celebes, the Moluccas, New Caledonia, and the New Hebrides. During this trip, many believe that she had an affair with Terence Philip, a wealthy art dealer seven years her junior. However, no conclusive evidence of this has been produced: indeed, Philip was believed by many to have been homosexual. She brought back from this trip a Bali dove. When it died, she buried it in the garden at Chartwell beneath a sundial. On the sundial's base, she had inscribed:

HERE LIES THE BALI DOVE
It does not do to wander
Too far from sober men.
But there's an island yonder,
I think of it again.

Clementine edited and rehearsed Churchill's speeches, as well as managing and attending high-level diplomatic summits.

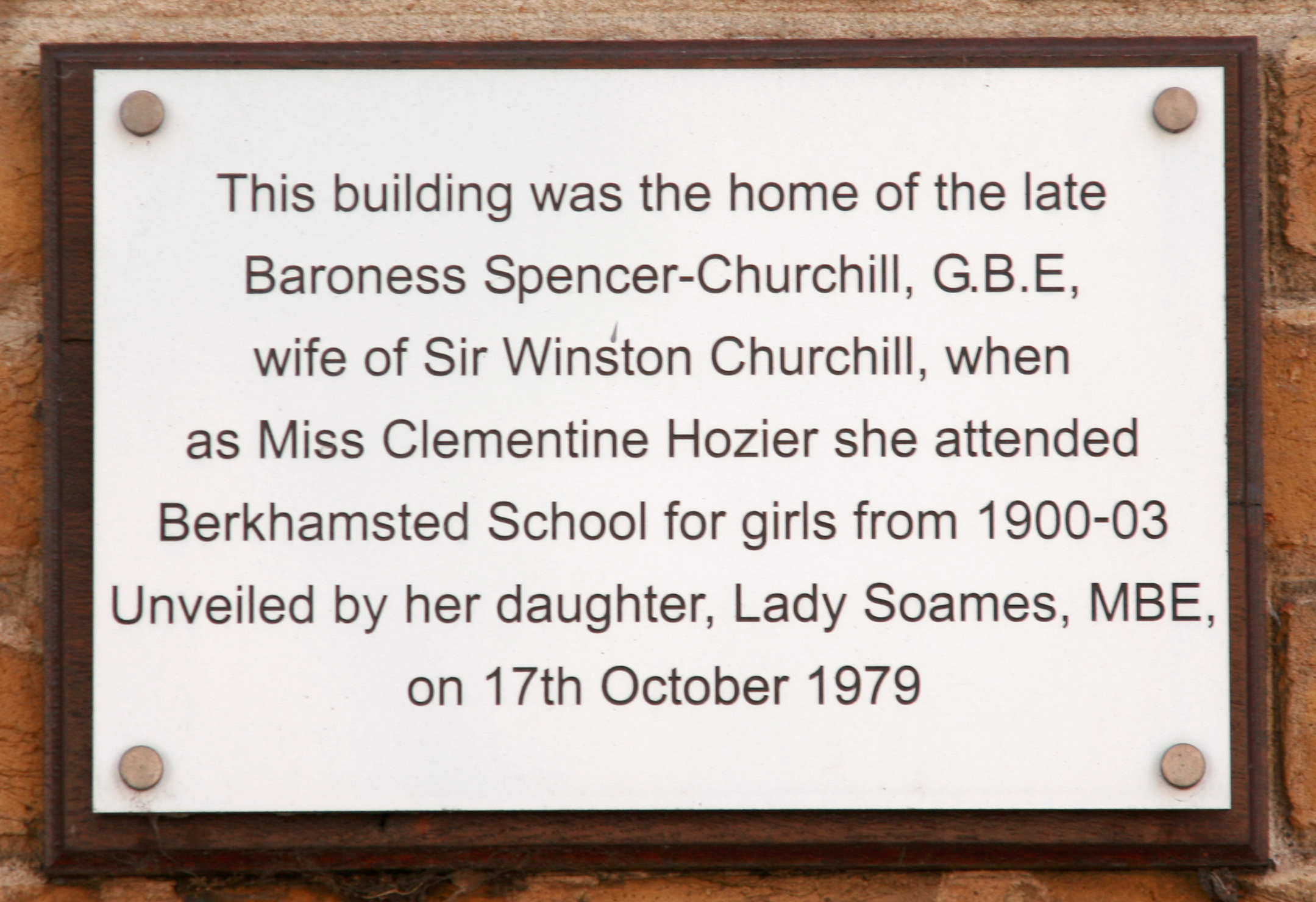
Plaque on Clementine Churchill's Berkhamsted house

As the wife of a politician who often took controversial stands, Clementine was used to being snubbed and treated rudely by the wives of other politicians. However, she could take only so much. Once, traveling with Lord Moyne and his guests, the party was listening to a BBC broadcast in which the speaker, a vehemently pro-appeasement politician, criticised Winston by name. Vera, Lady Broughton, a guest of Moyne, said "hear, hear" at the criticism of Churchill. Clementine waited for her host to offer a conciliatory word but, when none came, she stormed back to her cabin, wrote a note to Moyne, and packed her bags. Lady Broughton came and begged Clementine to stay, but she would accept no apologies for the insult to her husband. She went ashore and sailed for home the next morning.

During the Second World War, she was Chairman of the Red Cross Aid to Russia Fund, the president of the Young Women's Christian Association War Time Appeal and the Chairman of Maternity Hospital for the Wives of Officers, Fulmer Chase. While touring Russia near the end of the war, she was awarded the Order of the Red Banner of Labour.

In 1946, she was appointed Dame Grand Cross of the Order of the British Empire, becoming Dame Clementine Churchill GBE.

She was awarded honorary degrees by the University of Glasgow, University of Oxford and University of Bristol.

== Later life and death ==
After more than 56 years of marriage, Clementine was widowed on 24 January 1965 when her husband died aged 90.

After Sir Winston's death, on 17 May 1965, she was created a life peer as Baroness Spencer-Churchill, of Chartwell in the County of Kent. She sat as a cross-bencher, but her growing deafness precluded her taking a regular part in parliamentary life.

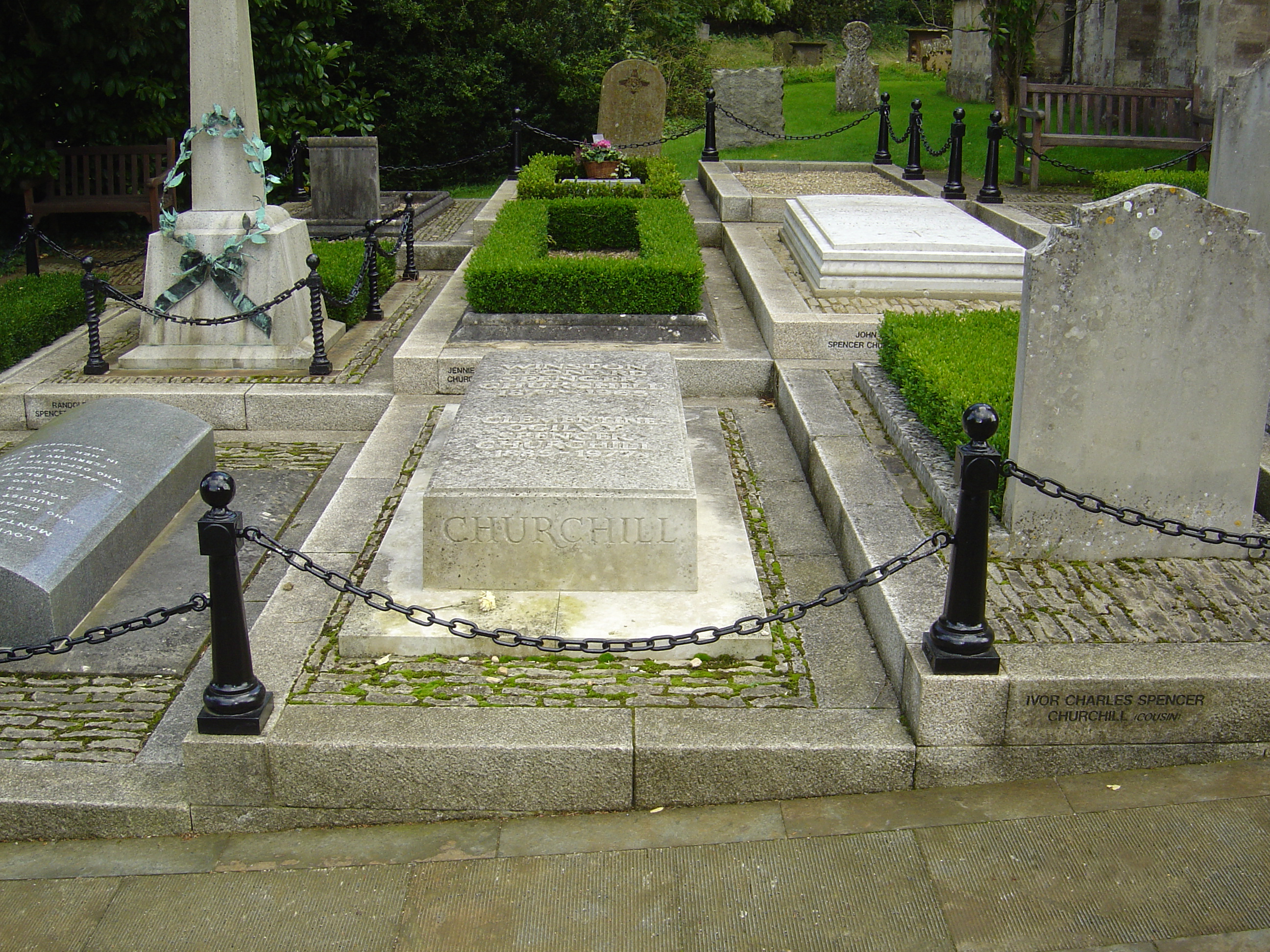
Clementine and Winston Churchill's grave at St Martin's Church, Bladon

In her final few years, inflation and rising expenses left Lady Spencer-Churchill in financial difficulties and in early 1977 she sold at auction five paintings by her late husband.

Lady Spencer-Churchill died at her London home, at 7 Princes Gate, Knightsbridge, of a heart attack on 12 December 1977. She was 92 years old and had outlived her husband by almost 13 years, as well as three of her five children.

She is buried with her husband and children (Note: Marigold was originally interred at Kensal Green Cemetery in London and her remains were exhumed in 2019 for reburial with the family at Bladon.) at St Martin's Church, Bladon, near Woodstock in Oxfordshire.

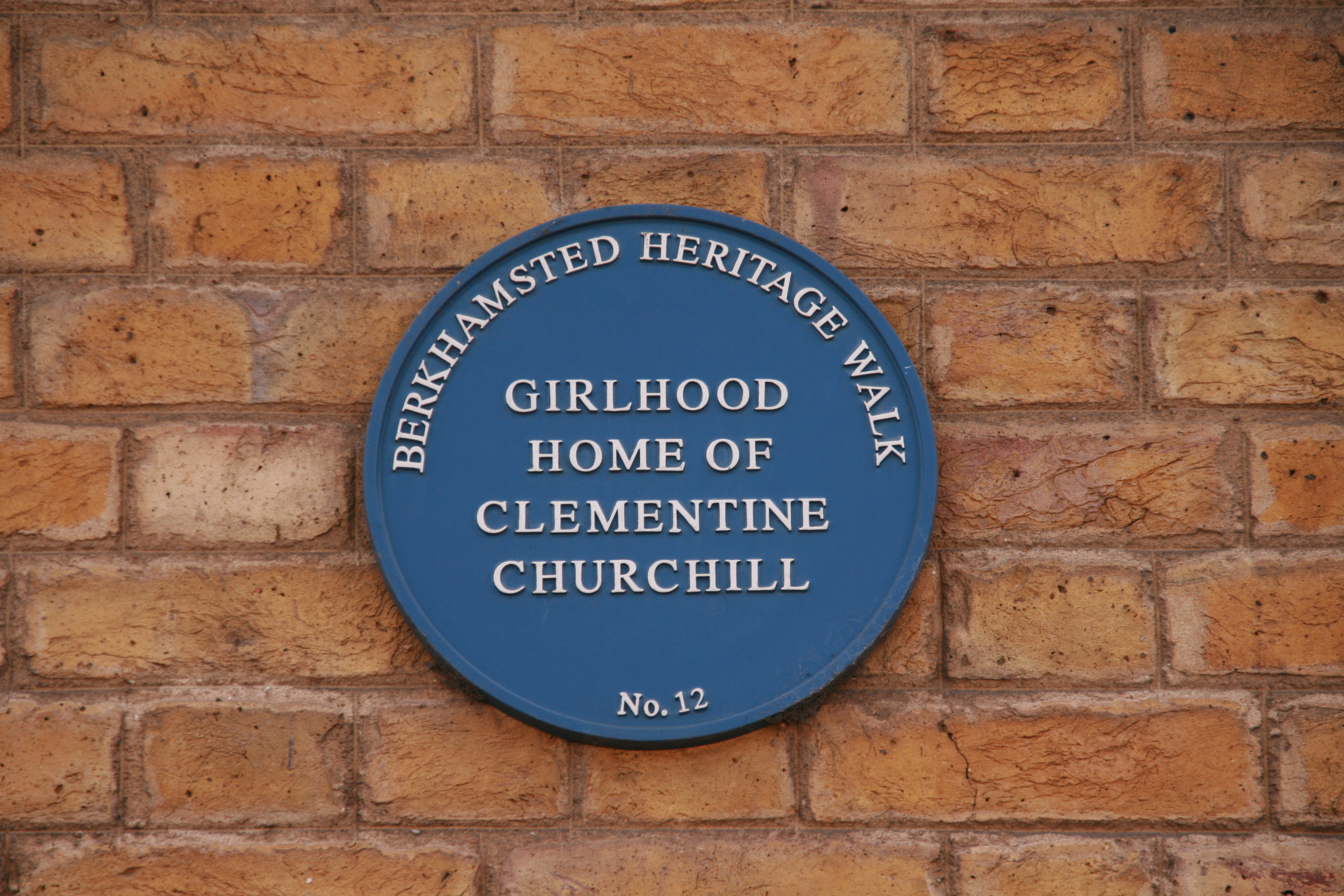

== Memorials ==
The Clementine Churchill Hospital in Harrow, Middlesex, is named after her.

A plaque on the Berkhamsted house where the young Clementine Hozier had lived during her education at Berkhamsted School for Girls was unveiled in 1979 by her youngest daughter, Baroness Soames. A blue plaque also commemorates her residence there.

== In popular culture ==
Clementine was played by Virginia McKenna in the 1974 television biopic The Gathering Storm opposite Richard Burton. In 1981, she was played by Siân Phillips in Winston Churchill: The Wilderness Years opposite Robert Hardy. She was played by Vanessa Redgrave in the 2002 biographical television movie The Gathering Storm. Dame Harriet Walter portrayed her in the first series of Peter Morgan's Netflix drama The Crown, and she was played by Dame Kristin Scott Thomas in the 2017 film Darkest Hour.

She was played by Miranda Richardson, opposite Brian Cox, in the 2017 film Churchill directed by Jonathan Teplitzky.

She was also featured in Jack Thorne's 2023 play When Winston Went to War with the Wireless, played by Laura Rogers.

== Arms ==
Coat of arms of Clementine Churchill

Coronet
Coronet of a Baron
Escutcheon
Quarterly: 1st & 4th, Sable, a Lion rampant Argent, on a Canton Argent a Cross Gules (Churchill); 2nd & 3rd, quarterly Argent and Gules, in the 2nd and 3rd quarters a Fret Or, over all on a Bend Sable, three Escallops Argent (Spencer); over all in the centre chief point (as an Honourable Augmentation) an Escutcheon Argent, charged with the Cross of St George surmounted by another Escutcheon Azure charged with three Fleurs-de-lis two and one Or; en surtout an Inescutcheon Vair, on a Chevron Gules, three Bezants, a Chief gyronny Or and Sable (Hozier).

== Sources ==
- Churchill, Randolph (1969). Companion Volume, 1907–1911. Authorised biography of Winston S. Churchill. Vol. II Part 2. London: Heinemann. OCLC 49932109.

== Biographies ==
- Lovell, M.S. (2012), The Churchills: A Family at the Heart of History – from the Duke of Marlborough to Winston Churchill, Abacus (Little, Brown), ISBN 978-0349-11978-6
- Purnell, S. (2015), First Lady: The Private Wars of Clementine Churchill, Aurum Press Limited, ISBN 978-1781-31306-0
- Soames, M. (2002), Clementine Churchill, Doubleday, ISBN 978-0385-60446-8
