= Tomb of Marigold Churchill =

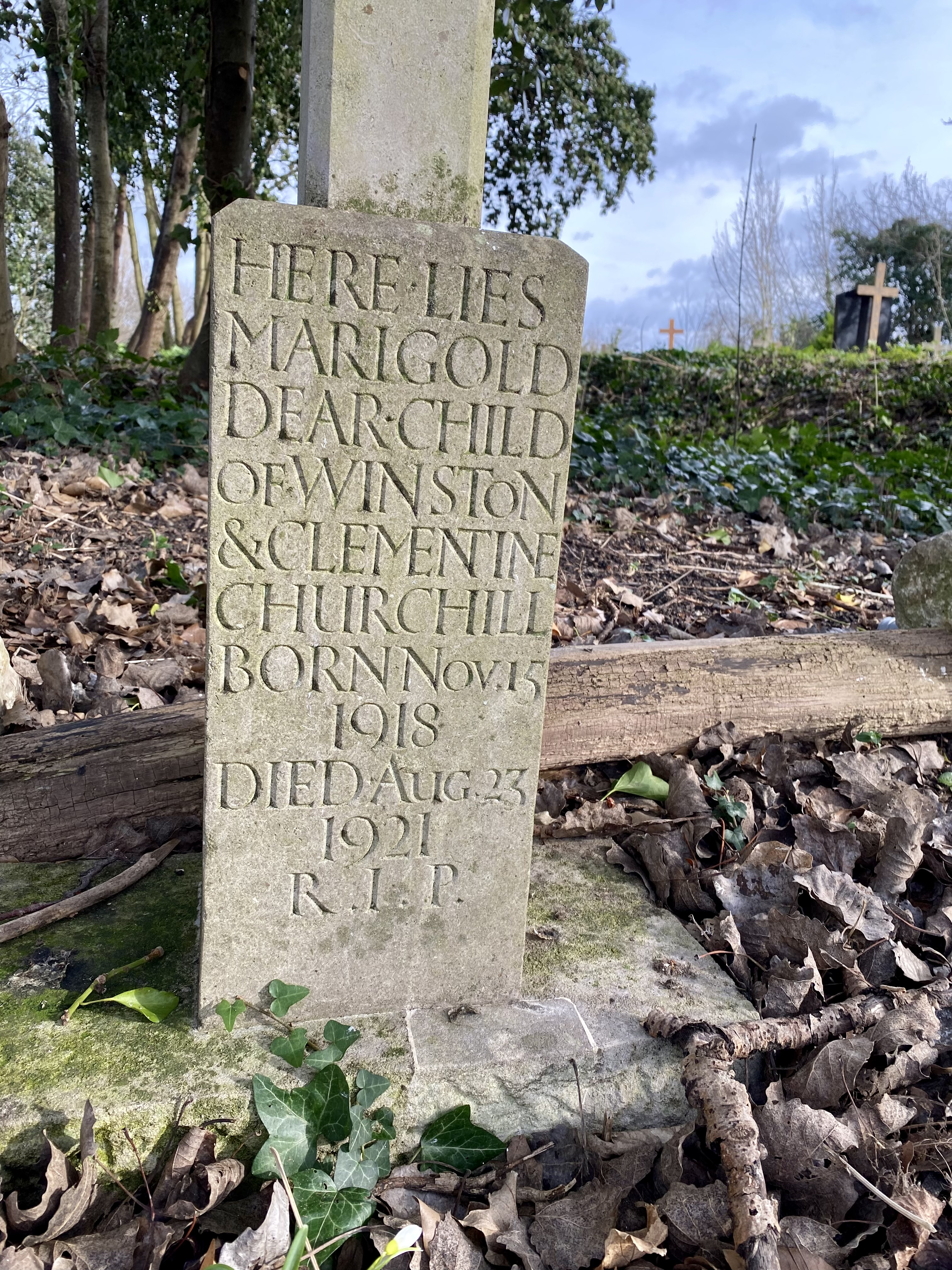
- Interactive map of the Tomb of Marigold Churchill area

General information
- Type: Funerary monument
- Location: Kensal Green Cemetery, Royal Borough of Kensington and Chelsea, London
- Coordinates: 51.5268°N 0.2277°W
- Construction started: 1867
- Governing body: General Cemetery Company

Listed Building – Grade II
- Official name: Tomb of Marigold Churchill
- Designated: 12 June 2001
- Reference no.: 1246128

Design and construction
- Architect: Eric Gill

The Tomb of Marigold Churchill is located in Kensal Green Cemetery in the Royal Borough of Kensington and Chelsea, London, England. It commemorates Marigold, the fourth child of Winston and Clementine Churchill. Marigold died aged two in 1921 and the tomb at Kensal Green was her grave until her reinterment in the Churchill family plot at St Martin's Church, Bladon, Oxfordshire in 2020. Designed by Eric Gill, the tomb is a Grade II listed structure.

== History ==
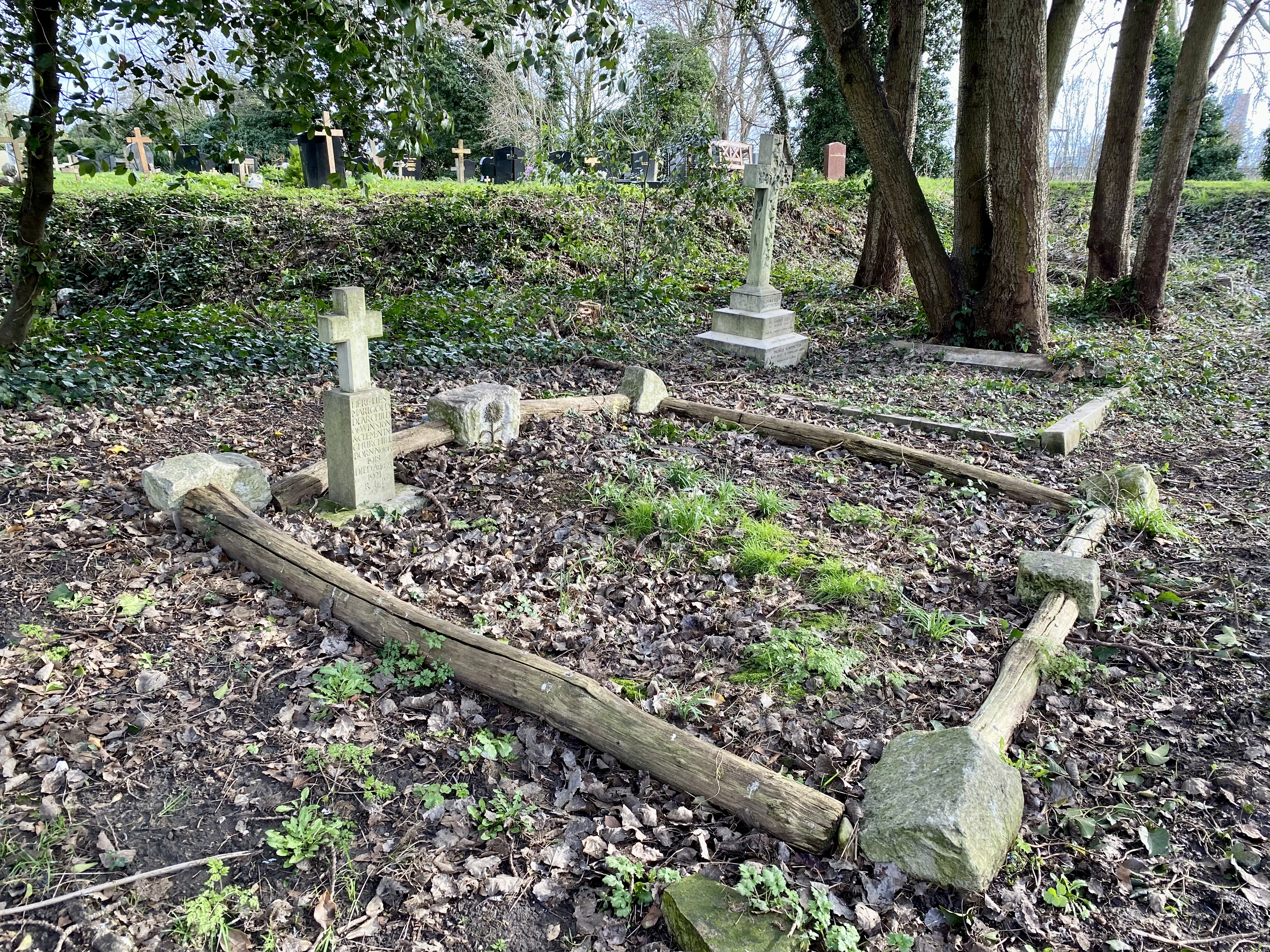
The tomb of Marigold Churchill in 2024

Marigold Churchill (15 November 1918 – 23 August 1921) was the fourth child of Winston and Clementine Churchill. She died of sepsis at the age of 2 years, 9 months, while on holiday at Broadstairs in Kent. Her death devastated her parents. She was buried at Kensal Green Cemetery three days after her death, in a private ceremony attended only by the Churchill family. Photographers who had come to the cemetery left at Churchill's request. In 2020 her body was exhumed and reburied in the Spencer-Churchill family plot at St Martin's Church, Bladon in Oxfordshire.

== Description ==
The tomb takes the form of a cross. It is carved in Hopton Wood Stone, a particularly fine form of limestone much used for gravestones. (Note: Oscar Wilde's tomb in Père Lachaise Cemetery in Paris is carved from Hopton Wood Stone.) The monument originally comprised a pedestal, with "exquisite" Gill lettering, topped with a shaft depicting the crucifixion. The wording on the pediment reads: "HERE LIES // MARIGOLD // DEAR CHILD // OF WINSTON // AND CLEMENTINE // CHURCHILL // BORN NOV 15 // 1918 // DIED AUG 23 // 1921 // R.I.P". The upper part of the memorial was stolen in 1992 and was replaced by a stone cross. The designer was Eric Gill. (Note: Historic England's Listing Guide for Commemorative Structures explicitly notes that private memorials built in the 20th century will rarely meet the listing criteria. It goes on to note Eric Gill's work as the "outstanding" example of the type, and cites the Memorial to Marigold Churchill as a "characteristic example".) It is a Grade II listed structure.

== Sources ==
- Pennington, Michael (1987). An Angel for a Martyr. Whitenights Press. ISBN 978-0-704-90113-1.
