= Sir Henry Strickland-Constable, 10th Baronet =

Baronet and composer (1900–1975)

Sir Henry Marmaduke Strickland-Constable, 10th Baronet (4 December 1900 – 26 March 1975) was a member of the English aristocracy, and a composer.

== Early life ==
He was the son of Lt.-Col. Frederick Charles Strickland-Constable (1860–1917) and Margaret Elizabeth Pakenham (1874–1961) of Wassand Hall, Hull. His sister, Hilary, married Henry John Ralph Bankes of Kingston Lacy and Corfe Castle, and his younger brother was Robert Frederick Strickland-Constable, a Lieutenant-Commander in the Royal Navy Volunteer Reserve during World War II.

His paternal grandparents were Henry Strickland-Constable (son of Sir George Strickland, 7th Baronet) and the former Cornelia Charlotte Anne Dumaresq (daughter of Col. Henry Dumaresq and Lady Elizabeth Sophia Butler-Danvers, half-sister to the 5th Earl of Lanesborough). His maternal grandparents were Rear-Adm. the Hon. Thomas Alexander Pakenham (son of the 2nd Earl of Longford) and the former Sophia Sykes (daughter of Sir Tatton Sykes). His uncle was Adm. Sir William Pakenham.

== Career ==
He was educated at Eton (where he had a song and a choral part song performed in 1918) before attending Magdalen College, Oxford, where he obtained a Bachelor of Music degree. In 1923 Strickland-Constable won the Cobbett composition prize at the Royal College of Music for his Phantasy String Quartet. While a student he also composed a Symphony in C minor, which was heard at the RCM in April 1925. The finale of the symphony (described by Frank Howes as "in the idiom of Elgar"), was heard again at the 1926 Heather Festival at Oxford.

He was the composer of the hymn tune Wassand, setting the words "God is Working his Purpose Out" by Arthur Campbell Ainger. A Violin Sonata was published by Augener in 1930. Two movements of an orchestral suite (though credited to M. Strickland Constable) were performed in 1935 at the RCM Patron's Fund rehearsal.

He succeeded as the 10th Baronet Strickland, of Boynton, on 9 August 1938 upon the death of a relative, Walter Strickland, known as the "Anarchist Baronet" and "Wandering Baronet" after he renounced his British citizenship.

== Personal life ==
On 24 July 1929, he married Countess Ernestine Caroline Valerie Antoinette von Rex (1905–1995), at St. Luke's Church, Munich. She was a daughter of Count Rudolf Karl Casper von Rex, and granddaughter of Count Karl von Rex. Her sister, Countess Marie Louise Rex, was the wife of Sir Odo Russell, a son of Odo Russell, 1st Baron Ampthill and Lady Emily Villiers (daughter of the 4th Earl of Clarendon).

Sir Henry died in hospital on 26 March 1975, and was succeeded by his younger brother, Robert. He was buried in the churchyard of St. Lawrence at Sigglesthorne in the East Riding of Yorkshire. After his death, Wassand Hall, passed to his widow, Lady Ernestine Strickland-Constable. Upon her death in 1995, the estate passed to her great-nephew, Rupert Russell.

Baronetage of England
Preceded by Walter Strickland	Baronet (of Boynton); 1938–1975	Succeeded by Robert Strickland-Constable
