= 1924 in the United Kingdom =

Events from the year 1924 in the United Kingdom.

== Incumbents ==
- Monarch – George V
- Prime Minister - Stanley Baldwin (Conservative) (until 16 January), Ramsay MacDonald (Labour) (starting 22 January, until 4 November), Stanley Baldwin (Conservative) (starting 4 November)

== Events ==
- 1 January – Meteorological Office issues its first broadcast Shipping Forecast, at this time called Weather Shipping.
- 10 January – British submarine HMS L24 sinks in a collision in the English Channel – 43 dead.
- 15 January – The world's first original adult radio play, Danger by Richard Hughes, is broadcast by the British Broadcasting Company from its studios in London.
- 22 January – Ramsay MacDonald becomes the first Labour Prime Minister, leading a minority government (First MacDonald ministry). This follows Stanley Baldwin's resignation after his government loses a vote of no confidence in the debate on the King's Speech.
- 23 January – Margaret Bondfield becomes the first woman to be appointed a government minister.
- 25 January–4 February – Great Britain and Ireland compete at the Winter Olympics in Chamonix, France and win 1 gold, 1 silver and 2 bronze medals.
- February
  - Baldwin establishes the Conservative Consultative Committee, the first organised Shadow Cabinet.
  - John Logie Baird, working in Hastings, sends rudimentary television pictures over a short distance.
- 1 February – The First MacDonald ministry recognises the Soviet Union.
- 5 February – The hourly Greenwich Time Signal from Royal Greenwich Observatory is broadcast for the first time.
- 18 February – Commissioning of HMS Hermes (95), the Royal Navy's first purpose-designed aircraft carrier.
- 28 March – First BBC broadcast from Plymouth (station 5PY).

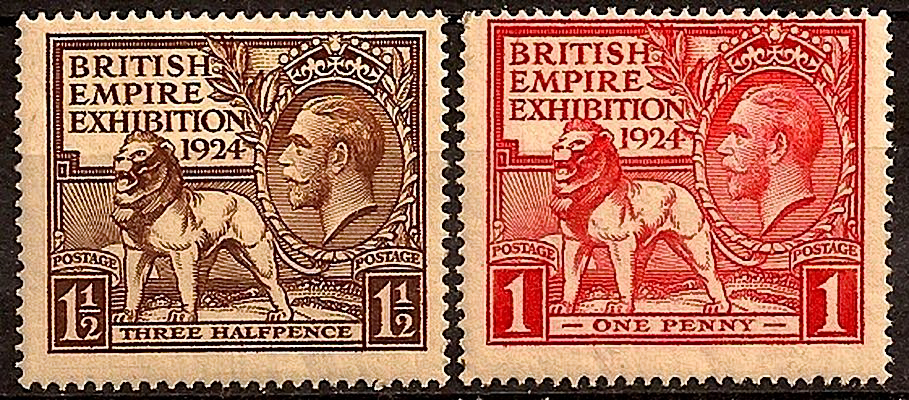
First UK Commemorative stamps

- 23 April – First broadcast by King George V, opening the British Empire Exhibition at Wembley Stadium.
- 26 April
  - Harry Grindell Matthews demonstrates his "death ray" in London but fails to convince the War Office.
  - Footwear retailer Charles Clinkard opens the doors to its first shop, in Middlesbrough.
- May – Royal Fine Art Commission appointed to advise the government on matters concerning the built environment.
- 4 May–27 July – Great Britain and Ireland compete at the Olympics in Paris and win 9 gold, 13 silver and 12 bronze medals.
- 30 May – Russell case decided on appeal to the House of Lords, which rules there is no admissible evidence of adultery against dress designer Christabel Russell, thus not a ground for divorce from her (now-separated) husband John Russell, 3rd Baron Ampthill, so paving the way for legitimising their son, despite medical evidence of her being a virgin.
- 3 June – Gleneagles Hotel opens in Scotland.
- 8 June – George Mallory and Andrew Irvine are last seen "going strong for the top" of Mount Everest by teammate Noel Odell at 12:50 PM. The two mountaineers are never seen alive again.
- 7 July – Harold Abrahams wins 100m gold at the Paris Olympics in a time of 10.6 seconds.
- 11 July – Eric Liddell wins 400m gold at the Paris Olympics in a new world record time of 47.6 seconds.
- 7 August – Housing (Financial Provisions) Act provides government subsidy for the building of houses to rent, principally by local authorities.
- 13 August – Campbell Case: The government forces charges of incitement to mutiny against communist newspaper editor J. R. Campbell to be dropped leading to its defeat in a vote of no confidence against the MacDonald ministry in the House of Commons.
- 27 August – The first Southport Flower Show opens.
- 30 August – Britain accepts the Dawes Plan for receiving German war reparations.
- 14 September – First BBC broadcast from Belfast (station 2BE).
- 24 October – The Foreign Office releases the Zinoviev Letter which is published in the following morning's Daily Mail. This purports to be a directive from Grigory Zinoviev, head of the Communist International in Moscow, to the Communist Party of Great Britain.
- 25 October – Authorities of the British Raj in India arrest Subhas Chandra Bose and jail him for the next two and half years.
- 29 October – 1924 general election is won by the Conservative Party under Stanley Baldwin with a large majority of 209 seats. The Liberal Party loses around two-thirds of its seats and will never again be as strong as previously. Among the new members of parliament is 30-year-old future Prime Minister Harold Macmillan, the new Conservative MP for Stockton-on-Tees (born in Chelsea to a British father and an American mother).
- 2 November – The Sunday Express becomes the first newspaper to publish a crossword.
- 22 November – Roman Catholic Diocese of Lancaster erected.
- 15 December – The Scottish county of Linlithgowshire is officially renamed West Lothian (the Act comes into effect in 1925).
- 24 December – 1924 Imperial Airways de Havilland DH.34 crash: Imperial Airways biplane G-EBBX crashes at Purley shortly after takeoff from Croydon Airport, killing all eight people on board, the new line's first fatal accident, leading to the first UK public inquiry into a civil aviation accident.

=== Undated ===
- Air Raid Precautions committee set up.
- The London and North Eastern Railway officially names its Flying Scotsman express train, although the service between London King's Cross and Edinburgh over the East Coast Main Line has previously been known by this title, and has operated since 1862.
- Edward Victor Appleton investigates the Heaviside layer.
- Frigidaire becomes the first make of refrigerator marketed in the UK.
- First nudist camp established, at Wickford, Essex.
- Bedgebury National Pinetum established in Kent.

== Publications ==
- Michael Arlen's novel The Green Hat.
- Agatha Christie's novel The Man in the Brown Suit.
- E. M. Forster's novel A Passage to India.
- Margaret Kennedy's novel The Constant Nymph.
- A. A. Milne's poem collection When We Were Very Young.
- Mary Webb's novel Precious Bane.
- P. C. Wren's novel Beau Geste.

== Births ==
- 1 January – John Warner, actor (died 2001)
- 3 January – Doug Ellis, entrepreneur and football club chairman (died 2018)
- 5 January – Eric Cheney, motorcycle designer (died 2001)
- 7 January – Geoffrey Bayldon, actor (died 2017)
- 8 January – Ron Moody, actor (died 2015)
- 12 January – Francis Coleman, orchestral conductor (born in Canada; died 2008)
- 13 January – Ivor Stanbrook, politician (died 2004)
- 19 January – Henry Herbert, 7th Earl of Carnarvon, peer and racing manager (died 2001)
- 21 January – Benny Hill, comedian and actor (died 1992)
- 22 January – Betty Lockwood, Baroness Lockwood, English academic and politician (died 2019)
- 23 January – David Macpherson, 2nd Baron Strathcarron, hereditary peer and motoring expert (died 2006)
- 27 January – Brian Rix, farceur and mental disability campaigner (died 2016)
- 3 February – E. P. Thompson, historian (died 1993)
- 5 February – Anthony Besch, opera and theatre director (died 2002)
- 9 February – George Guest, organist and choirmaster (died 2002)
- 14 February – Patricia Knatchbull, 2nd Countess Mountbatten of Burma, peeress (died 2017)
- 24 February – Lionel Dakers, organist (died 2003)
- 29 February – Steve Llewellyn, rugby union player (died 2002)
- 2 March – William Howie, Baron Howie of Troon, politician (died 2018)
- 3 March – John Woodnutt, actor (died 2006)
- 5 March – Peter Lasko, German-born art historian (died 2003)
- 7 March – Eduardo Paolozzi, sculptor (died 2005)
- 8 March – Anthony Caro, sculptor (died 2013)
- 10 March – Angela Morley, composer and conductor, known as Wally Stott (died 2009)
- 12 March – Mary Lee Woods, mathematician and computer programmer (died 2017)
- 19 March – Mary Wimbush, actress (died 2005)
- 24 March – Henry Alfred Symonds, soldier (died 1994)
- 28 March – Freddie Bartholomew, actor (died 1992)
- 30 March – Alan Davidson, food writer (died 2003)
- 2 April – Denis Rooke, industrialist and engineer (died 2008)
- 3 April – Peter Hawkins, actor, voice artist (died 2006)
- 8 April – Anthony Farrar-Hockley, army general and military historian (died 2006)
- 12 April
  - Walter Hayes, journalist (died 2000)
  - F. N. Souza, Indian-born artist (died 2002)
- 13 April – Mary Spiller, horticulturist and teacher (died 2019)
- 14 April
  - Robert Stewart, textile designer (died 1995)
  - Philip Stone, actor (died 2003)
  - Mary Warnock, moral philosopher (died 2019)
- 15 April
  - Rikki Fulton, actor and comedian (died 2004)
  - Neville Marriner, conductor and violinist (died 2016)
- 16 April – John Harvey-Jones, businessman (died 2008)
- 20 April
  - Leslie Phillips, comic actor (died 2022)
  - Jack Slipper, detective (died 2005)
- 22 April – Peter Cathcart Wason, psychologist (died 2003)
- 23 April – Norman Painting, actor (died 2009)
- 24 April
  - Clement Freud, writer, radio personality and politician (died 2009)
  - Clive King, writer (died 2018)
- 1 May – Dennis Main Wilson, broadcast comedy producer (died 1997)
- 3 May – Ken Tyrrell, racing driver (died 2001)
- 7 May – James Learmonth Gowans, immunologist (died 2020)
- 10 May – Edward Thomas Hall, scientist (died 2001)
- 11 May
  - Antony Hewish, radioastronomer, recipient of the Nobel Prize in Physics (died 2021)
  - Jackie Milburn, footballer (died 1988)
- 12 May – Tony Hancock, comedian (died 1968)
- 14 May – Kenneth V. Jones, composer, conductor and music teacher (died 2020)
- 17 May – Francis Tombs, Baron Tombs, industrialist and politician (died 2020)
- 19 May – Sandy Wilson, composer (died 2014)
- 20 May – Peter Shore, politician (died 2001)
- 23 May – Michael McCrum, academic (died 2005)
- 24 May – Vincent Cronin, historical writer and biographer (died 2011)
- 25 May – Gordon Smith, footballer (died 2004)
- 28 May
  - Edward du Cann, Conservative politician (died 2017)
  - Reginald Eyre, politician (died 2019)
- 1 June – John Tooley, opera administrator (died 2020)
- 2 June
  - Peter Halliday, actor (died 2012)
  - Timothy Moxon, actor (died 2006)
- 3 June – Ken Armstrong, English association football player (died 1984)
- 5 June – Rodney Diak, actor (died 2007)
- 6 June – John Ambler, businessman (died 2008)
- 8 June – Iain Glidewell, lawyer and judge (died 2016)
- 9 June
  - Tony Britton, actor (died 2019)
  - Donald J. West, psychiatrist and parapsychologist (died 2020)
- 17 June
  - Edward Downes, orchestral conductor (died 2009)
  - Archibald Hall, Scottish murderer (died 2002)
- 18 June – Thomas Kerr, aerospace engineer (died 2004)
- 21 June – Wally Fawkes, English-born Canadian jazz clarinetist and cartoonist (died 2023)
- 24 June – Anthony Barrowclough, lawyer and government ombudsman (died 2003)
- 27 June – Bob Appleyard, cricketer (died 2015)
- 28 June – Roy Austen-Smith, Royal Air Force officer (died 2021)
- 2 July – Francis Wyndham, English author, literary editor and journalist (died 2017)
- 3 July
  - Michael Barrington, actor (died 1988)
  - Gwen Moffat, climber and writer
  - Sue Ryder, charity founder and campaigner (died 2000)
- 4 July
  - Eric Cockeram, politician (died 2021)
  - Roy Gibson, Director General of ESRO
- 6 July
  - Brian Stanbridge, air force officer (died 2003)
  - Jon Wynne-Tyson, publisher, writer and animal rights campaigner (died 2020)
- 7 July
  - Gordon Bagier, politician (died 2012)
  - Jean Valentine, codebreaker (died 2019)
- 8 July – Peter Lovell-Davis, publisher and politician (died 2001)
- 10 July – Philip Ward, major-general (died 2003)
- 11 July – Charlie Tully, footballer (died 1971)
- 12 July
  - Eve Branson, philanthropist and child welfare advocate (died 2021)
  - Irene Sutcliffe, actress (died 2019)
- 14 July – James W. Black, Scottish-born pharmacologist, recipient of the Nobel Prize in Physiology or Medicine (died 2010)
- 15 July
  - Peter Armitage, statistician specialising in medical statistics (died 2024)
  - David Cox, statistician (died 2022)
- 24 July – Vivean Gray, British-born Australian television and film actress (died 2016)
- 24 July – Edward Digby, 12th Baron Digby, peer and Army officer (died 2018)
- 29 July – Arnold Weinstock, businessman (died 2002)
- 31 July
  - Garard Green, actor (died 2004)
  - Mary Holt, politician and judge (died 2021)
- 1 August – John Clive Ward, English-born physicist, "father of the British H-bomb" (died 2000)
- 4 August – Antony Rowe, rower (died 2003)
- 6 August – Winifred Watkins, biochemist (died 2003)
- 7 August
  - Kenneth Kendall, newsreader and presenter (died 2012)
  - Helen Taylor Thompson, social activist (died 2020)
- 10 August – Nancy Buckingham, romance novelist (died 2022)
- 12 August – Derek Shackleton, cricketer (died 2007)
- 15 August – Robert Bolt, playwright and screenwriter (died 1995)
- 20 August – John Ellis Williams, writer (died 2008)
- 21 August – Gerald David Lascelles, nobleman and cousin of Queen Elizabeth II (died 1998)
- 24 August
  - Alyn Ainsworth, musician, singer and conductor (died 1990)
  - Jimmy Gardner, actor (died 2010)
- 26 August – John Peake, English field hockey player (died 2022)
- 30 August – Peter Parker, businessman and railway executive (died 2002)
- 31 August – George Sewell, actor (died 2007)
- 3 September – Bob Coats, economic historian (died 2007)
- 4 September – Joan Aiken, writer (died 2004)
- 10 September – Elizabeth Killick, naval electronics engineer (died 2019)
- 14 September – Paul Dean, Baron Dean of Harptree, politician (died 2009)
- 21 September
  - Edmund Ironside, 2nd Baron Ironside, hereditary peer, naval officer and businessman (died 2020)
  - David Sylvester, art critic (died 2001)
- 22 September
  - Charles Keeping, illustrator (died 1988)
  - Rosamunde Pilcher (née Scott), novelist (died 2019)
- 23 September – Vivien Alcock, children's writer (died 2003)
- 24 September – Lady Mary Whitley, noblewoman (died 1999)
- 30 September
  - David Snow, ornithologist (died 2009)
  - Peter Yarranton, rugby union player (died 2003)
- 7 October – John Hanscomb, politician (died 2019)
- 8 October – John Nelder, statistician (died 2010)
- 15 October – Douglas Reeman, writer (died 2017)
- 17 October – David Butler, academic psephologist (died 2022)
- 24 October
  - Christine Glanville, puppeteer (died 1999)
  - Ullin Place, philosopher and psychiatrist (died 2000)
- 30 October – Norman Bird, actor (died 2005)
- 5 November – John Bowen, playwright and novelist (died 2019)
- 6 November – William Auld, poet and esperantist (died 2006)
- 9 November – John Knatchbull, 7th Baron Brabourne, peer and television producer (died 2005)
- 18 November – Alexander Mackenzie Stuart, Scottish judge (died 2000)
- 19 November
  - William Russell, actor (died 2024)
  - Margaret Turner-Warwick, physician and thoracic specialist (died 2017)
- 20 November - Timothy Evans, lorry driver (died 1950)
- 21 November – Christopher Tolkien, son and editor of the works of J. R. R. Tolkien (died 2020)
- 29 November
  - Margaret Gelling, toponymist (died 2009)
  - Arthur Peacocke, theologian and biochemist (died 2006)
- 4 December – Shirley Paget, Marchioness of Anglesey, public servant and writer (died 2017)
- 5 December – John Keston, actor, singer and masters athlete (died 2022)
- 6 December – George Pinker, obstetrician and gynecologist (died 2007)
- 30 December – Peter Harding, rock climber (died 2007)

== Deaths ==
- 2 January – Sabine Baring-Gould, hymnodist, folklorist and novelist (born 1834)
- 15 February – Lionel Monckton, musical comedy composer (born 1861)
- 22 March – Sir William Macewen, Scottish surgeon (born 1848)
- 27 March – Sir Walter Parratt, composer (born 1841)
- 29 March – Sir Charles Villiers Stanford, composer (born 1852)
- 21 April – Marie Corelli, novelist (born 1855)
- 4 May – E. Nesbit, children's novelist and Fabian socialist (born 1858)
- 8/9 June – lost on Everest
  - Andrew Irvine, mountaineer (born 1902)
  - George Mallory, mountaineer (born 1886)
- 23 June – Cecil Sharp, folk-song collector (born 1859)
- 13 July – Alfred Marshall, economist (born 1842)
- 14 July – Isabella Ford, socialist, feminist, trade unionist and writer (born 1855)
- 3 August – Joseph Conrad, novelist (born 1857 in Poland)
- 15 August – Francis Knollys, 1st Viscount Knollys, courtier, Private Secretary to King Edward VII (born 1837)
- 22 August – James Acton, cricketer (born 1848)
- 27 August – Sir William Bayliss, physiologist (born 1860)
- 18 September – F. H. Bradley, philosopher (born 1846)
- 17 October – Hector C. Macpherson, Scottish writer and journalist (born 1851)
- 18 October – Sir Percy Scott, admiral (born 1853)
- 29 October – Frances Hodgson Burnett, English-born American children's novelist (born 1849)
- 10 November – Sir Archibald Geikie, geologist (born 1835)
- 12 November – E. D. Morel, journalist and politician (born 1873 in France)
- 20 November – Ebenezer Cobb Morley, sportsman, "father" of the Football Association (born 1831)
- 24 November – Henry Somerset, 9th Duke of Beaufort, aristocrat (born 1847)
- 26 November – Sir William Acland, 2nd Baronet, admiral (born 1847)
- 31 December – Sir Samuel Knaggs, colonial administrator (born 1856)

== See also ==
- List of British films of 1924
