= David Russell, 5th Baron Ampthill =

British politician (born 1947)

The Right Honourable The Lord Ampthill
- Born: 27 May 1947 (age 78)
- Spouse(s): April Arbon; Christia Ipsen
- Children: 2
- Father: Geoffrey Russell
- Relatives: John Russell (grandfather); Christabel Hart (grandmother)

David Whitney Erskine Russell, 5th Baron Ampthill (born 27 May 1947), is the son of Geoffrey Russell, 4th Baron Ampthill, and was educated at Stowe School. He served as a councillor on Rye Town Council from July 2003 until April 2013, and formerly served as a Conservative councillor on Rother District Council. He previously served on East Grinstead Town Council and held the post of Mid Sussex District Council Cabinet Member for Community Development. Before entering politics, Russell enjoyed a career in publishing.

== Personal life ==
By first wife, April McKenzie Arbon, he has two daughters. He is currently married to his second wife, Christia Ipsen, widow of Prince Rostislav Rostislavovich Romanov.

== Succession to baronial title ==
He succeeded his father as Baron Ampthill in April 2011; the title had been created for his great-great-grandfather, Lord Odo Russell, who represented Britain unofficially at the Vatican and officially at Berlin; Lord Odo's uncle was Lord John Russell, who was twice Prime Minister and whose grandson was Bertrand Russell, the eminent 20th century philosopher.

Peerage of the United Kingdom
Preceded by Geoffrey Russell	Baron Ampthill; 2011–present	Incumbent; Heir presumptive: Hon. Anthony Russell
