= Karl von Rex =

German politician

Karl, Count von Rex
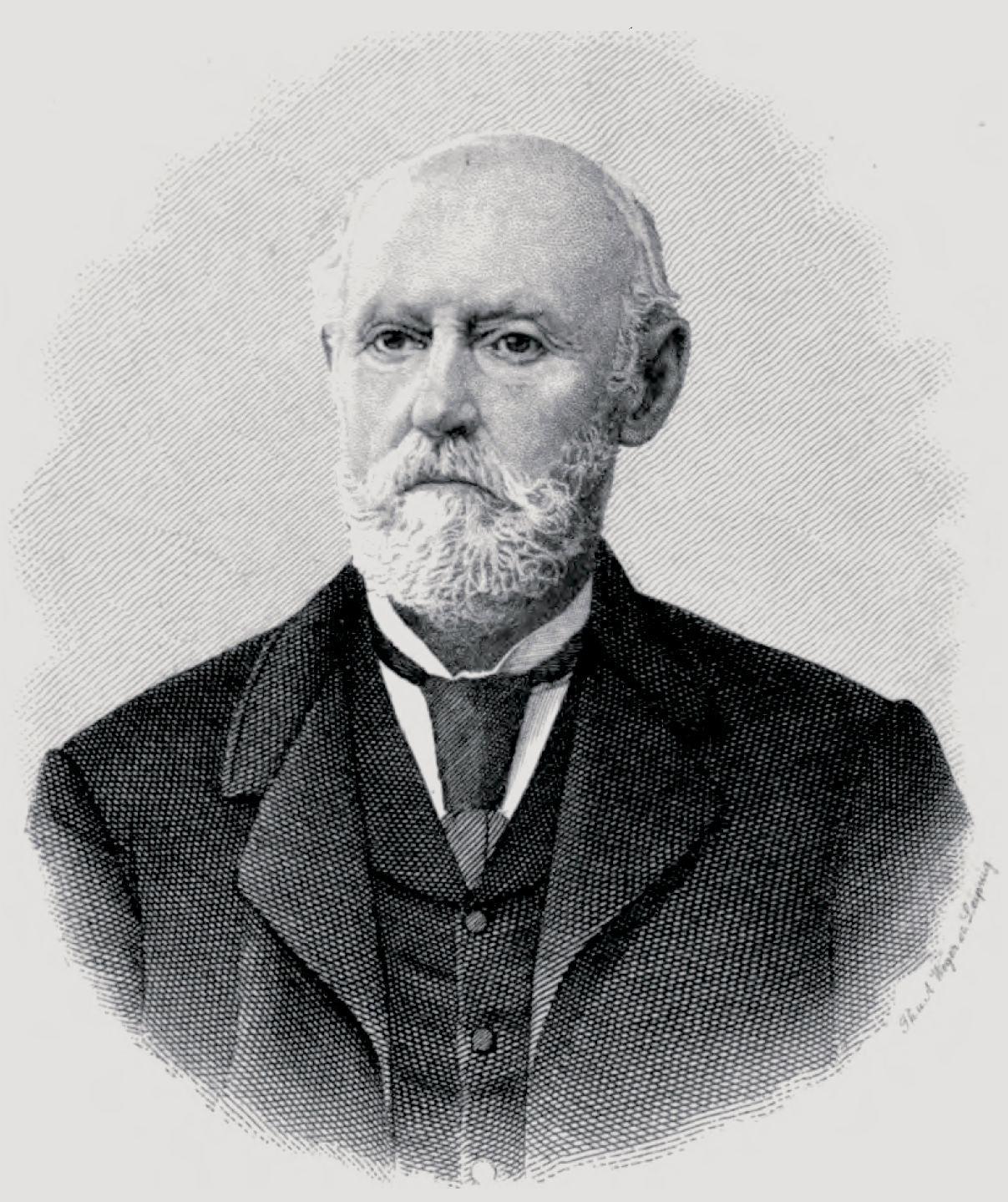
- Born: Karl Caspar von Rex; 23 April 1825; Dresden
- Died: 21 October 1905 (aged 80); Dresden
- Spouse: Margarete von Metzradt (m. 1856; died 1905)
- Children: Rudolf Karl Caspar von Rex; Victor von Rex

Karl Caspar, Count von Rex (23 April 1825 – 21 October 1905) was a German politician.

== Early life ==
Count von Rex was born on 23 April 1825 in Dresden. He was the son of Karl Alexander, Count von Rex (1780–1849) and Therese Clementine, Countess von Nostitz and Jänkendorf (1789–1870), sister to Georg von Nostitz.

== Career ==
A Canon of Meissen and provost of Bautzen, Rex was a Royal Saxon chamberlain and major in the Artillery. He owned the Oberörtmannsdorf manor near Marklissa in Lower Silesia and the Zedtlitz manor in the Kingdom of Saxony and was assigned to the First Chamber in the Diet by royal appointment as manor owner in 1873, holding a permanent seat until his death.

In 1869 he became a member of the Royal Saxon Association for the Research and Preservation of Patriotic Historical Monuments.

== Personal life ==
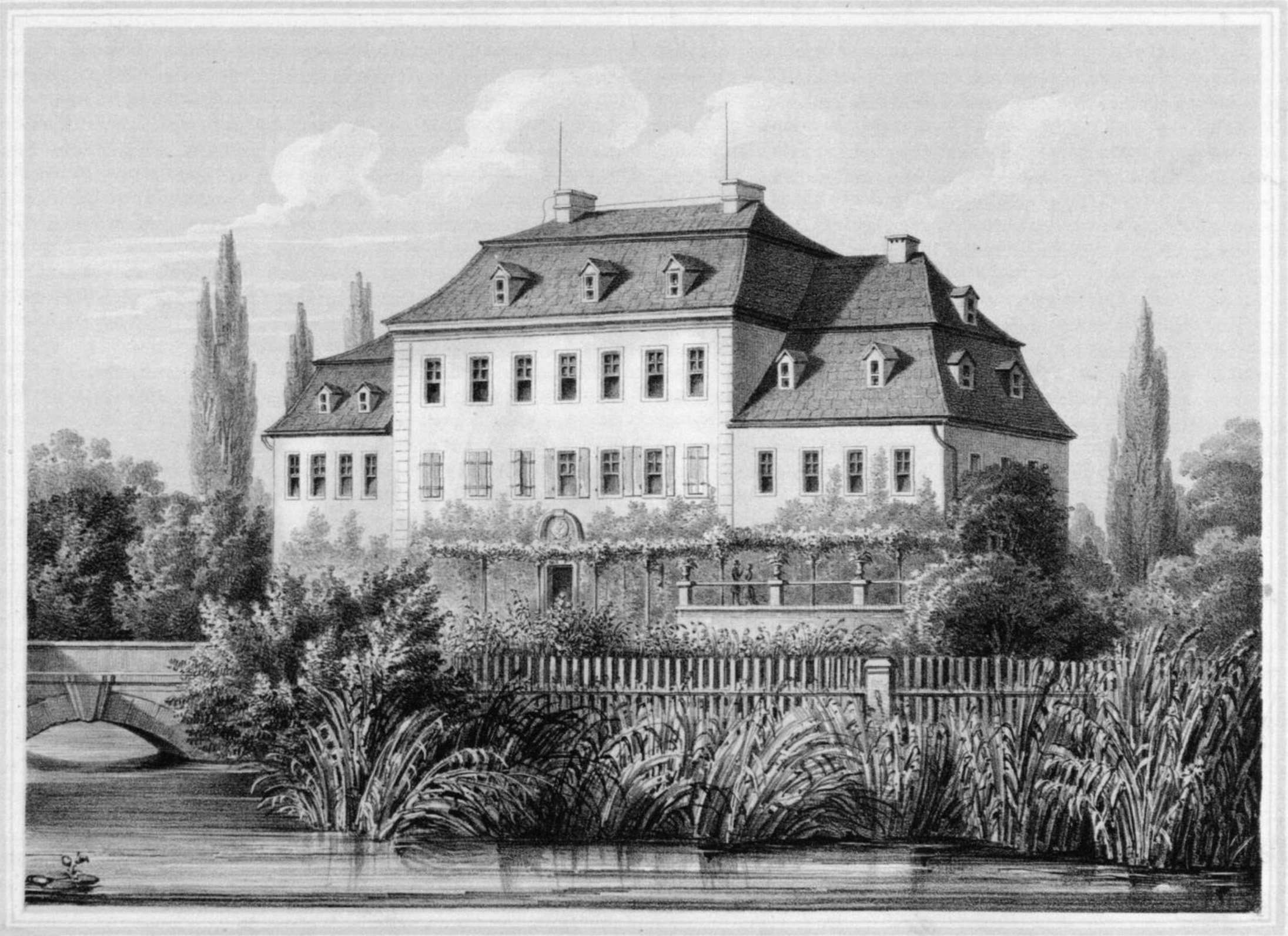
Schloss Zedtlitz, 1840

On 29 October 1856 he married Margarete von Metzradt (1836–1931) in Zedtlitz. She was the daughter of Rudolf von Metzradt-Hermsdorf and Amalie Marie von Nostitz und Jänkendorf-Oppach. Together, they were the parents of:

- Rudolf Karl Caspar von Rex (1858–1916), who became a Saxon chamberlain, privy councilor and diplomat; he married Countess Marie Anna zu Pappenheim, daughter of Count Maximilian zu Pappenheim.
- Victor Karl Caspar von Rex (1865–1947), who married Susanne Marie Luise von Oppell.

Count von Rex died in Dresden on 21 October 1905. His eldest son Rudolf inherited Zedtlitz Castle and his younger son Victor inherited Oberörtmannsdorf and Hermsdorf from his mother.

=== Descendants ===
Through his son Rudolf, he was grandfather to Countess Marie Louise Rex (d. 1966), wife of Sir Odo Russell, (Note: Sir Odo Russell was a son of Odo Russell, 1st Baron Ampthill and Lady Emily Villiers (daughter of the 4th Earl of Clarendon).) and Countess Ernestine "Edina" von Rex (1905–1995), wife of Sir Henry Strickland-Constable, 10th Baronet. (Note: Sir Henry Strickland-Constable, 10th Baronet was the son of Lt.-Col. Frederick Charles Strickland-Constable and Margaret Elizabeth Pakenham (sister of Adm. Sir William Pakenham, daughter of Rear-Adm. Hon. Thomas Alexander Pakenham and granddaughter of the 2nd Earl of Longford), in 1929.)
