= John Russell, 3rd Baron Ampthill =

British peer (1896–1973)

Captain The Right Honourable The Lord Ampthill CBE
- Born: 4 October 1896
- Died: 3 June 1973 (aged 76)
- Spouse(s): Christabel Hart (m. 1918, divorced) Sibell Lumley (m. 1937; died 1947) Adeline Hone (m. 1948)
- Children: 3, including Geoffrey
- Parents: Oliver Russell (father); Margaret Lygon (mother)
- Relatives: Guy Russell (brother); Odo Russell (grandfather); Emily Villiers (grandmother); Frederick Lygon (grandfather)

Captain John Hugo Russell, 3rd Baron Ampthill CBE (4 October 1896 – 3 June 1973) was a British peer who served in the Royal Navy in both the First and Second World Wars.

He was the son of Oliver Russell, 2nd Baron Ampthill. He succeeded to the title of Baron Ampthill, of Ampthill in the County of Bedford on 7 July 1935.

== Personal life ==
Russell was married three times; firstly to Christabel Hulme Hart on 18 October 1918 (died February 1976); secondly to Sibell Faithfull Lumley on 22 February 1937, following a divorce from his first wife (died 1947); and thirdly to Adeline Mary Constance Hone on 24 July 1948 (died 2004).

His first marriage to Christabel Hart was notorious for its divorce proceedings and the question of the legitimacy of her firstborn as the heir, where she claimed that the marriage had never been consummated and she was still a virgin. The House of Lords agreed with her appeal to legitimize her son.

Children from marriage to Christabel Hulme Hart:

- Geoffrey Denis Erskine Russell (15 October 1921–23 April 2011), later 4th Baron Ampthill

Children from marriage to Adeline Mary Constance Hone:

- John Hugo Trenchard Russell (13 October 1950–)
- Georgiana Adeline Villiers Russell (3 January 1952–)

Upon the third baron's death, his son from his third marriage disputed the succession, but to no avail.

The third baron is buried in the churchyard of St Michael's, Chenies, along with his wife Adeline Mary Constance Hone.

== See also ==
- Russell Case

Peerage of the United Kingdom
Preceded by Oliver Russell	Baron Ampthill; 1935–1973	Succeeded by Geoffrey Russell
