= Catfoss =

Hamlet in the East Riding of Yorkshire, England

Coordinates: 53.917966°N 0.267020°W

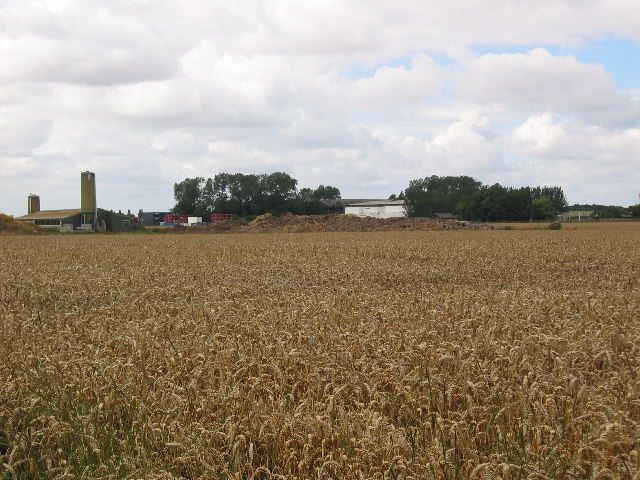

- Location within the East Riding of Yorkshire
- OS grid reference: TA139482
  - London: 165 mi (266 km) S
- Civil parish: Seaton
- Unitary authority: East Riding of Yorkshire
- Ceremonial county: East Riding of Yorkshire
- Region: Yorkshire and the Humber
- Country: England
- Sovereign state: United Kingdom
- Post town: HULL
- Postcode district: HU11
- Dialling code: 01964
- Police: Humberside
- Fire: Humberside
- Ambulance: Yorkshire
- UK Parliament: Bridlington and The Wolds

Catfoss is a hamlet in the civil parish of Seaton, in Holderness, in the East Riding of Yorkshire, England. It is situated approximately 5 miles (8 km) west of the town of Hornsea. The hamlet is mentioned in the Domesday Book as having ten villagers, six ploughlands, and meadows covering 24 acres (9.7 ha). the name derives from two elements; the first is a personal name (Catta) and the second is a common word for a stream or watercourse in Northern England (Foss). Catfoss Lane, between Catfoss and Brandesburton, is the location of the former RAF Catfoss, an airfield which is now home to a variety of businesses.

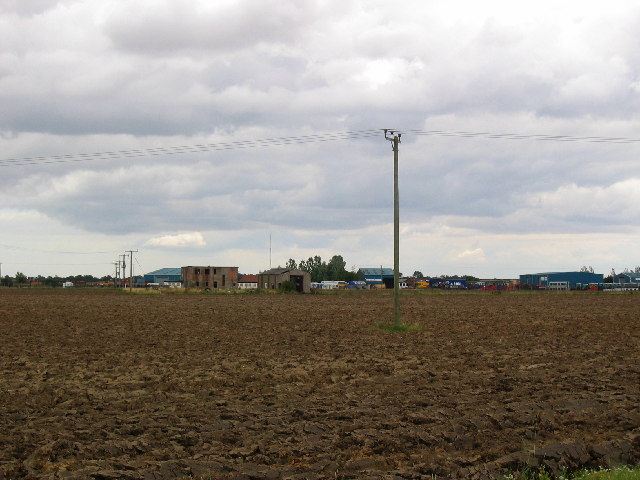
Light industry at Catfoss Lane

== Governance ==
It is represented at Westminster as part of the Bridlington and The Wolds constituency.

Catfoss was formerly a township in the parish of Sigglesthorne, in 1866 Catfoss became a separate civil parish, on 1 April 1935 the parish was abolished and merged with Seaton. In 1931 the parish had a population of 197.

== See also ==
- Listed buildings in Seaton, East Riding of Yorkshire
