= Russell case =

1922–24 British divorce proceedings

Russell v. Russell
- Court: U.K. House of Lords
- Full case name: Christabel Hulme Russell v. John Hugo Russell
- Decided: 30 May 1924
- Citation: 1924 A.C. 687

Case history
- Appealed from: Court of Appeal

Court membership
- Judges sitting: Earl of Birkenhead, Viscount Finlay, Lord Dunedin, Lord Sumner, Lord Carson

Keywords
- divorce; adultery; paternity

The Russell case, also called the Ampthill baby case, was a series of proceedings related to the conception of Geoffrey Russell. It covered two divorce cases and the claim to the British peerage title Baron Ampthill, and the possibility of a virgin birth.

John Russell, the heir apparent to Oliver Russell, 2nd Baron Ampthill, married Christabel Hart in 1918. In 1921 Christabel discovered she was about five months pregnant. The couple had not fully consummated their marriage, though they had slept in the same bed in Oakley House for a night the preceding December. John sued for divorce on grounds of adultery, naming two co-respondents and one unknown. Christabel claimed she was a virgin and produced medical expert evidence that prior to the birth of Geoffrey in October 1921 she had an only partly perforated hymen. She also claimed that her husband had undertaken "Hunnish (that is to say Barbaric) scenes" and had attempted to rape her on the night in question, and that she had used a sponge he had previously used.

In the initial divorce case Russell v. Russell in 1922, the two named co-respondents were acquitted while the case for the unnamed partner was inconclusive. In the second divorce case in 1923, Christabel was convicted of adultery and lost on appeal, but had the verdict overturned on further appeal to the House of Lords which ruled in 1924 that no child born after a marriage could be declared illegitimate merely on the testimony of his mother or father. The scandal led to the enactment of the Judicial Proceedings (Regulation of Reports) Act 1926 to prevent detailed evidence in divorce cases appearing in newspapers.

The couple remained separated, and were finally divorced after John had become 3rd Baron Ampthill in 1935. Lord Ampthill married secondly Sibell Faithfull Lumley, who died in 1947 without issue. Lord Ampthill then married, as his third wife, Adeline Hone in 1948, and they had two children: John in 1950 and Georgiana in 1952.

John died in 1973 and the younger John challenged Geoffrey's right to inherit the Ampthill barony. In 1976, the House of Lords Committee For Privileges reported that the younger John had not made out his claim, so confirming Geoffrey as the 4th Baron Ampthill; Geoffrey's mother died while the case was under consideration.
