= Wassand =

Hamlet in the East Riding of Yorkshire, England

Coordinates: 53.899541°N 0.215043°W

- Location within the East Riding of Yorkshire
- OS grid reference: TA173462
- Civil parish: Seaton
- Unitary authority: East Riding of Yorkshire
- Ceremonial county: East Riding of Yorkshire
- Region: Yorkshire and the Humber
- Country: England
- Sovereign state: United Kingdom
- Post town: HULL
- Postcode district: HU11
- Dialling code: 01964
- Police: Humberside
- Fire: Humberside
- Ambulance: Yorkshire
- UK Parliament: Bridlington and The Wolds

Wassand is a hamlet in the East Riding of Yorkshire, England. It is situated approximately 3 miles (4.8 km) west of Hornsea and to the south of the A1035 road (formerly B1244).

It forms part of the civil parish of Seaton.

The name Wassand derives from the Old Norse vaðsandr meaning 'sand ford'.

Wassand Hall is a large Regency house overlooking Hornsea Mere. The hall was designated a Grade II* listed building in March 1952 and is now recorded in the National Heritage List for England, maintained by Historic England.

Wassand was served from 1865 to 1953 by Wassand railway station on the Hull and Hornsea Railway.

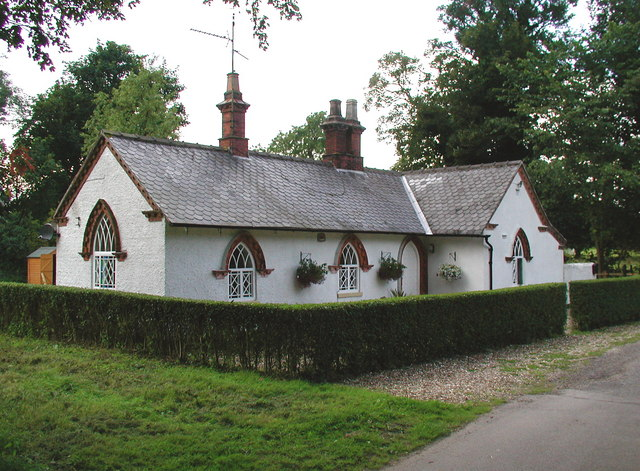
East Lodge, Wassand Hall

== See also ==
- Listed buildings in Seaton, East Riding of Yorkshire
