= James Thompson (civil servant) =

British civil servant and administrator

Sir James Thompson KCSI

Member of the Council of Secretary of State for India

Governor of Madras (acting)
- In office 30 April 1904 – 13 December 1904
- Governor-General: Oliver Russell, 2nd Baron Ampthill (acting)
- Preceded by: Oliver Russell, 2nd Baron Ampthill
- Succeeded by: Oliver Russell, 2nd Baron Ampthill

Member of the Executive Council of the Governor of Madras
- In office 1901–1906
- Governor: Oliver Russell, 2nd Baron Ampthill

Personal details
- Born: 6 July 1848 Cults, Aberdeenshire
- Died: 28 December 1929 St Albans, Hertfordshire
- Spouse: Charlotte Georgine Grant

Sir James Thompson KCSI (6 July 1848 – 28 December 1929) was a British civil servant and administrator who acted as the governor of Madras from 30 April 1904 to 13 December 1904.

== Early life and education ==
James Thompson was born in 1848 to John Thomson in Cults, Aberdeenshire. He had his schooling at Grammar school and graduated from the University of Aberdeen. He completed his master's degree in 1868 and qualified for the Indian Civil Service in 1869.

== Service in India ==
Thompson arrived in India in 1871 and served as Assistant Collector in the Madras Presidency from 1872 to 1882, as Head Assistant Collector from 1882 to 1885 as Sub-Collector from 1885 to 1889 and Collector from 1889 to 1895. In 1895, Thompson was appointed Resident for the Travancore and Cochin states and served from 1895 to 1897 when he was appointed to the Board of Revenue for the Madras Presidency.

Thompson was nominated to the Madras Legislative Council in 1898 and served as a member of the Executive Council of the Governor of Madras from 1901 to 1906. Thomson acted as the Governor of Madras from 30 April 1904 to 13 December 1904 in the absence of Oliver Russell, 2nd Baron Ampthill who was selected to officiate temporarily as the Viceroy of India. In 1908, Thompson was nominated to the council of the Secretary of State for India.

== Honours ==
Thompson was made a Knight Commander of the Order of the Star of India in the year 1904.

== Family ==
Thompson married Charlotte Georgina Grant, the eldest daughter of William White Grant in 1873. He married secondly Margaret Ellen Todhunter, the daughter of Sir Charles Todhunter, in 1898.
