= Listed buildings in Sigglesthorne =

Sigglesthorne is a civil parish in the county of the East Riding of Yorkshire, England. It contains five listed buildings that are recorded in the National Heritage List for England. Of these, one is listed at Grade II*, the middle of the three grades, and the others are at Grade II, the lowest grade. The parish contains the village of Sigglesthorne and the surrounding area. All the listed buildings are in the village, and consist of a church, a former school, a rectory, and a house and associated outbuildings.

== Key ==
| Grade | Criteria |
|---|---|
| II* | Particularly important buildings of more than special interest |
| II | Buildings of national importance and special interest |

== Buildings ==
| Name and location | Photograph | Date | Notes | Grade |
|---|---|---|---|---|
| St Lawrence's Church; 53.89436°N 0.24498°W | | Early 13th century | The church has been altered and extended through the centuries, including a restoration in 1847–48 by J. L. Pearson. It is built in cobbles and brick, with stone dressings and lead roofs. The church consists of a nave with a clerestory, north and south aisles, a south porch, a south chapel, a chancel with a north vestry, and a west tower. The tower has three stages, a chamfered plinth, angle buttresses, chamfered string courses, lancet windows in the bottom stage, a plaque and a sundial with a bronze gnomon on the middle stage, bell openings with two trefoil-headed lights and a vesica above in a pointed arch, and an embattled parapet. | II* |
| The Rectory; 53.89417°N 0.24352°W | — | 1767 | The rectory is in brown brick, with a timber modillion eaves cornice, and a pantile roof, hipped over the main block, and with tumbled-in brick to the raised gables on the rear wings. There are two storeys and attics, six bays, and three rear wings under separate roofs. The doorway has an architrave and a projecting cornice on shaped brackets, and the windows are sashes in architraves under flat gauged brick arches. Above are three gabled roof dormers. | II |
| Former Sunday School; 53.89444°N 0.24546°W | | 1818 | The former school is in the churchyard of St Lawrence's Church, to the northwest of the church. It is in roughcast brick with a hipped slate roof. There is one storey and four bays. It contains four doorways and sash windows, all under hood moulds. On the school is an inscribed and dated plaque. | II |
| Sigglesthorne Hall; 53.89105°N 0.24454°W | — | c. 1820 | The house, which was later enlarged, is in light grey brick, on a moulded plinth, with stone dressings, corner and intermediate pilasters, a deep moulded eaves cornice, a coped parapet and slate roofs. There are two storeys, three bays, and recessed single-bay wings. The main block has a central French window under a flat gauged brick arch and a decorated band. This is flanked by full-height canted bay windows, and the other windows are sashes under flat gauged brick arches. The entrance front has four bays and an Ionic porch, with columns in antis, a full entablature, and a ramped parapet with gablets on the corner-pieces. The door has a rectangular fanlight and side lights. These are flanked by shouldered round-arched niches, panels and consoles carrying a moulded shelf. The upper floor contains decorated panels. | II |
| Coach house and stables, Sigglesthorne Hall; 53.89110°N 0.24418°W | — | c. 1820 | The building is in light grey brick, with a dentilled eaves cornice, and hipped slate roofs. In the centre is block with two storeys and two bays containing an entrance, above which is a floor band, sash windows under cambered wedge lintels, and a pyramidal roof with a timber lantern and a weathervane. The block is flanked by wings with one storey and a loft, and two bays. These contain doorways and sash windows, and on the left wing are two oculi with louvres. | II |
