= Listed buildings in Seaton, East Riding of Yorkshire =

Seaton is a civil parish in the county of the East Riding of Yorkshire, England. It contains eleven listed buildings that are recorded in the National Heritage List for England. Of these, one is listed at Grade II*, the middle of the three grades, and the others are at Grade II, the lowest grade. The parish contains the village of Seaton, the hamlets of Wassand and Catfoss, and the surrounding countryside. The most important building in the parish is the country house Wassand Hall, which is listed together with a number of associated structures, and all the other listed buildings are houses.

== Key ==
| Grade | Criteria |
|---|---|
| II* | Particularly important buildings of more than special interest |
| II | Buildings of national importance and special interest |

== Buildings ==
| Name and location | Photograph | Date | Notes | Grade |
|---|---|---|---|---|
| House opposite Village Farm; 53.90347°N 0.22829°W | — | Early 18th century | The house is in colourwashed red brick, with a dentilled brick eaves cornice, and a pantile roof with tumbled-in brick to the raised gable. On the front is a doorway flanked by sash windows, all under segmental gauged brick heads. | II |
| Seaton Hold; 53.91788°N 0.22600°W | | Mid-18th century | The house is in red brick with a floor band, a stepped brick eaves cornice, and a double-span pantile roof with tumbled-in brick to the raised gables. There are two storeys and an attic, a double-depth plan, and three bays. In the centre is a porch and a doorway, and the windows are sashes, those on the ground floor with segmental wedge lintels and projecting keystones. | II |
| Catfoss Hall; 53.90115°N 0.25498°W | — | Late 18th century | The house, which was extended to the left in the late 19th century, is in brown brick, with a line of squared stone blocks with central drillings at first floor level, a dentilled timber eaves cornice, and a hipped slate roof. There are two storeys, three bays on the original part and three bays on the extension. The middle bay of the original part projects and contains a doorway with a fanlight. The windows are sashes under segmental gauged brick arches. | II |
| Buttercup Farm; 53.90542°N 0.21517°W | — | 1790 | The house is in red brick with rusticated quoins, a stepped eaves cornice, and a hipped pantile roof. There are two storeys and five bays. On the front is a porch, two blocked windows and sash windows. The ground floor windows have segmental arches and fanned keystones. On the left return at eaves level is a datestone. | II |
| Wassand Hall; 53.89717°N 0.21483°W | | 1813–19 | A country house in white brick on a stone plinth, with stone dressings, a floor band, an eaves cornice, a hipped slate roof, and two storeys. The west entrance front has three bays, the middle bay projecting slightly and containing a doorway with a pediment, flanked by sash windows. The windows are sashes; those flanking the doorway and above it are tripartite. To the left is a lower service wing with two storeys and three bays. The south front has five bays, and the east front has six. The north front, with three central bays and a parapet, contains a porch with pilasters and an open pediment, and a round-headed doorway with an ornate fanlight and a double keystone. Flanking it are oval windows, and above it is a round-headed sash window. | II* |
| Hornsea Lodge; 53.90248°N 0.21880°W | | c. 1815 | The east lodge to Wassand Hall, it is in painted and rendered brick on a plinth, with stone dressings and a tile roof. There is a single storey and three bays, the right bay projecting and gabled. On the middle bay is a doorway with a pointed arch, the windows are casements with pointed arches and fanlights with Gothic glazing. All the openings have dentilled surrounds, and the windows have dentilled impost bands. | II |
| West Lodge; 53.89696°N 0.22547°W | | 1815 | The west lodge to Wassand Hall, it is in colourwashed roughcast brick, with overhanging eaves and pierced bargeboards, and a tile roof. There is a single storey, two bays and a rear outshut. The left bay is recessed, and has an open timber verandah and a pointed doorway. On the right bay and the outshut are pointed casement windows with Gothic glazing. | II |
| Stable block, Wassand Hall; 53.89814°N 0.21456°W | | c. 1820 | The stable block and coach houses are in white brick on a plinth, with stone dressings, an eaves band, overhanging eaves and shallow hipped roofs. There are three ranges around a rectangular courtyard, the east range with two storeys, the north and south ranges with one story, and a west wall with gate piers. The east range has five bays, the middle bay projecting slightly and containing a door with a fanlight, and flanked by segmental-headed carriage entrances. On the roof is a square cupola with a clock. Each wing has a central triple arched loggia with two circular brick columns, and sash windows. | II |
| Seaton House; 53.90305°N 0.23072°W | | Early 19th century | The house is in light grey brick, with stone dressings and hipped slate roofs. There are two storeys and three bays, and flanking lower wings with two storeys and one bay. In the centre is a Roman Doric porch with an entablature and a triglyph frieze. The doorway has pilasters, panelled reveals and a soffit, and a fanlight with radial glazing. The windows are sashes with cambered channelled wedge lintels and projecting keystones with a feather motif. | II |
| Highfield House; 53.90495°N 0.23251°W | | c. 1837 | The house is in red brick with a hipped slate roof. There are two storeys and three bays. In the centre is a Doric doorcase with a panelled soffit and reveals. The windows are sashes under slightly cambered wedge lintels with projecting keystones. | II |
| Manor Farmhouse; 53.90630°N 0.26241°W | — | c. 1840 | The house is in orange brick with a hipped slate roof. There are two storeys and three bays. In the centre is a Doric porch and a doorway with a fanlight. The windows are sashes under slightly cambered channelled wedge lintels with projecting keystones. | II |
