= Odo Russell (diplomat) =

British diplomat

The Honourable Sir Odo Russell KCMG KCVO CB

British Minister to the Netherlands
- In office 1928–1933
- Preceded by: The Earl Granville
- Succeeded by: Sir Hubert Montgomery

British Minister on a Special Mission to His Holiness the Pope
- In office 1922–1928
- Preceded by: The Count de Salis-Soglio
- Succeeded by: Sir Henry Chilton

Brititsh Minister to the Swiss Confederation
- In office 1919–1922
- Preceded by: Sir Horace Rumbold, Bt
- Succeeded by: Sir Milne Cheetham

Personal details
- Born: Odo William Theophilus Russell; 3 May 1870
- Died: 23 December 1951 (aged 81)
- Spouse: Countess Marie Louise von Rex (m. 1910; died 1951)
- Relations: Arthur Russell, 2nd Baron Ampthill (brother); Lord George Russell (grandfather)
- Children: 3
- Parent(s): Odo Russell, 1st Baron Ampthill; Lady Emily Villiers

Sir Odo William Theophilus Russell KCMG KCVO CB (3 May 1870 – 23 December 1951) was a British diplomat who was ambassador to Switzerland, the Vatican and the Netherlands.

== Early life ==
Russell was the second son of Odo Russell, later the first Baron Ampthill, by Lady Emily Villiers, daughter of George Villiers, 4th Earl of Clarendon and Lady Katherine Grimston (daughter of the 1st Earl of Verulam). His elder brother was Arthur Russell, 2nd Baron Ampthill.

His paternal grandparents were Maj.-Gen. Lord George Russell (second son of the 6th Duke of Bedford) and Elizabeth Anne Rawdon (niece of the 1st Marquess of Hastings). His grand-uncle was the 1st Earl Russell, twice Prime Minister of the United Kingdom.

== Career ==
Russell entered the Diplomatic Service in 1892 and served in Rome, Athens, St Petersburg, Berlin, Buenos Aires and Vienna, where he held the rank of counsellor from 1909 to 1915. He was then Diplomatic Secretary to the Secretary of State for Foreign Affairs from 1915 to 1919, Minister at Bern from 1919 to 1922, Minister to the Holy See from 1922 to 1928 and Minister at The Hague from 1928 to 1933 (the last three posts were equivalent to modern ambassadorships). He was appointed Commander of the Royal Victorian Order (CVO) in 1909, Companion of the Order of the Bath (CB) in the 1916 Prime Minister's Resignation Honours, Knight Commander of the Royal Victorian Order (KCVO) in 1923 and Knight Commander of the Order of St Michael and St George (KCMG) in the 1926 Birthday Honours.

== Personal life ==
On 25 June 1910, while he was stationed in Vienna, Russell married Countess Marie Louise von Rex (10 July 1890 – 16 November 1966), daughter of Count Rudolf Karl Caspar von Rex, the Saxon Minister at the Austro-Hungarian Court. Together, they had three sons:

- Cosmo Rex Ivor Russell (1911–2003), who married Agnes Mary Parsons, daughter of Rev. Richard Edward Parsons, Canon of York, in 1941.
- Alaric Charles William Russell (1912–1986), who married Iris Charmian van Raalte, daughter of Noel van Raalte, in 1940.
- David Hastings Gerald Russell (1915–1999), who married Hester Clere Parsons, another daughter of the Rev. Richard Edward Parsons, in 1940.

Russell and his wife, the Countess, are buried in the churchyard of St Michael's, Chenies, together with other members of the Russell family.

Diplomatic posts
Preceded by Sir Horace Rumbold, Bt	Envoy Extraordinary and Minister Plenipotentiary to the Swiss Confederation; 1919–1922	Succeeded by Sir Milne Cheetham
Preceded by The Count de Salis-Soglio	Envoy Extraordinary and Minister Plenipotentiary on a Special Mission to His Holiness the Pope; 1922–1928	Succeeded by Sir Henry Chilton
Preceded by The Earl Granville	Envoy Extraordinary and Minister Plenipotentiary to Her Majesty the Queen of the Netherlands; 1928–1933	Succeeded by Sir Hubert Montgomery
