= Henry Chilton =

British diplomat

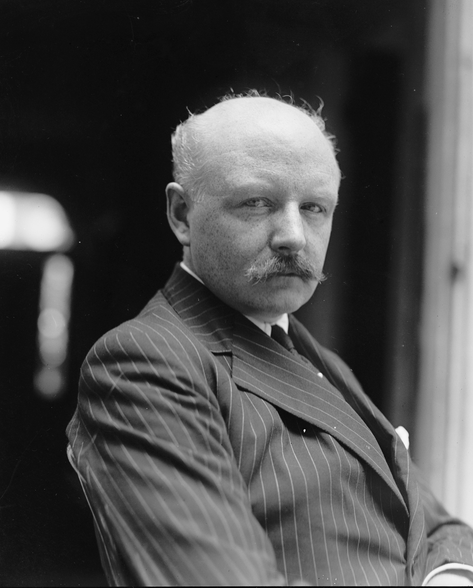
Henry Chilton in 1922

Sir Henry Getty Chilton GCMG (15 October 1877 – 20 November 1954) was a British diplomat who was minister to the Vatican and ambassador to Chile, Argentina and Spain during the Spanish Civil War.

== Career ==
He was educated at Wellington College and joined the Diplomatic Service as an attaché in 1902. He served at Vienna, Copenhagen; The Hague; Brussels; Berlin and Washington, DC, before he was appointed Counseller of Embassy at Rio de Janeiro in 1920 and then at Washington, DC, in 1921.

In 1924, he was promoted to be Minister to the United States under the Ambassador, Sir Esmé Howard. Still with the rank of minister, he was the British envoy to the Vatican from 1928 to 1930. He was then promoted to ambassador and posted to Chile 1930–33, to Argentina (1933–1935) and to Spain (1935-1939).

Soon after the outbreak of the Spanish Civil War in 1936, several embassies in Madrid, including the British, evacuated to Hendaye, France, on the border with Spain. "Chilton was a blatant admirer of the nationalists and preferred to stay in Hendaye rather than return to Madrid" while it was still under Republican control. He left Hendaye on long leave prior to his retirement in December 1937. The Times stated, "His has been an exacting, delicate and in many respects a thankless task, carried out with unfailing courtesy and devotion to duty." Geoffrey Thompson, secretary to the embassy, was chargé d'affaires until Owen O'Malley, who held the rank of minister, took over the embassy at Hendaye. Chilton returned to Hendaye in May 1939 on his way to Madrid to collect his belongings. He was succeeded as ambassador by Sir Maurice Peterson in the autumn of 1939.

During the Second World War, Chilton worked in the Ministry of Economic Warfare and then in the Ministry of Information. He accompanied Lord Willingdon on a trade mission to South America in 1940 to 1941. Sir Henry also served in the Home Guard from 18 June 1940 to 13 September 1941.

== Family ==
Born on 15 October 1877 at West Clandon, Guildford, Surrey. His mother was Caroline Chilton and father Alfred R.T.Chilton.

In 1906, while he was serving in Copenhagen, Chilton married Katherine, the daughter of Thomas J. O'Brien, the US ambassador to Denmark. They had two daughters. Katherine died in 1959.

== Honours ==
Henry Chilton was appointed CMG in the New Year Honours of 1921, knighted KCMG in the King's Birthday Honours of 1930 and raised to GCMG in the New Year Honours of 1934.

== Offices held ==
Diplomatic posts
| Preceded by Hon. Sir Odo Russell | Envoy Extraordinary and Minister Plenipotentiary to His Holiness the Pope; 1928–1930 | Succeeded by George Ogilvie-Forbes (chargé d'affaires) |
| Preceded by Archibald Clark Kerr | Ambassador Extraordinary and Plenipotentiary to the Republic of Chile; 1930-1933 | Succeeded by Sir Robert Michell |
| Preceded by Sir Ronald Macleay | Ambassador Extraordinary and Plenipotentiary at Buenos Aires; 1933-1935 | Succeeded by Sir Nevile Henderson |
| Preceded by Sir George Grahame | Ambassador Extraordinary and Plenipotentiary at Madrid; 1935-1938 | Succeeded by Sir Maurice Peterson |
