= Seaton, East Riding of Yorkshire =

Village and civil parish in the East Riding of Yorkshire, England

Coordinates: 53.903957°N 0.230990°W

Seaton
- Location within the East Riding of Yorkshire
- Population: 433 (2011 census)
- OS grid reference: TA163467
- Civil parish: Seaton
- Unitary authority: East Riding of Yorkshire
- Ceremonial county: East Riding of Yorkshire
- Region: Yorkshire and the Humber
- Country: England
- Sovereign state: United Kingdom
- Post town: HULL
- Postcode district: HU11
- Dialling code: 01964
- Police: Humberside
- Fire: Humberside
- Ambulance: Yorkshire
- UK Parliament: Bridlington and The Wolds

Seaton is a village and civil parish in the East Riding of Yorkshire, England. It is situated approximately 2.5 miles (4 km) west of Hornsea on the A1035 road (formerly B1244).

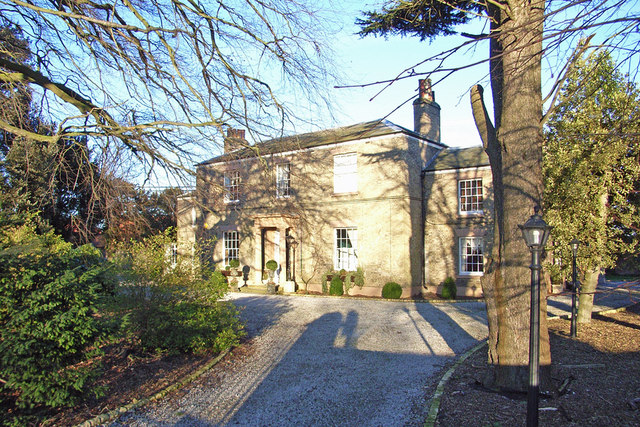
Seaton House

The civil parish consists of the village of Seaton and the hamlets of Catfoss and Wassand. According to the 2011 UK census, Seaton parish had a population of 433, an increase on the 2001 UK census figure of 409.

The name Seaton derives from the Old English sǣtūn meaning 'settlement by a lake'.

== See also ==
- Listed buildings in Seaton, East Riding of Yorkshire
