= Baron Ampthill =

Barony in the Peerage of the United Kingdom

- Arms of Russells, Barons Ampthill: Argent, a lion rampant gules, on a chief sable three escallops argent, a mullet or for difference.
- Creation date: 11 March 1881
- Created by: Queen Victoria
- Peerage: Peerage of the United Kingdom
- First holder: Odo Russell, 1st Baron Ampthill
- Present holder: David Russell, 5th Baron Ampthill
- Heir presumptive: Anthony John Mark Russell
- Remainder to: the 1st Baron's heirs male of the body lawfully begotten.

Baron Ampthill, of Ampthill in the County of Bedfordshire, is a title in the Peerage of the United Kingdom. It was created on 11 March 1881 for the diplomat Lord Odo Russell. He was the third son of Major-General Lord George Russell, second son of John Russell, 6th Duke of Bedford.

His son, the second Baron, served as Governor of Madras from 1899 to 1906 and was interim Viceroy of India in 1904. His grandson, the fourth Baron whose right to inherit was unsuccessfully challenged in 1976, was one of the ninety elected hereditary peers that remained in the House of Lords after the passing of the House of Lords Act 1999, and sat as a cross-bencher. As of 2014 the title is held by the latter's son, the fifth Baron, who succeeded his father in 2011.

== Barons Ampthill (1881) ==
- Odo William Leopold Russell, 1st Baron Ampthill (1829–1884)
- Arthur Oliver Villiers Russell, 2nd Baron Ampthill (1869–1935)
- John Hugo Russell, 3rd Baron Ampthill (1896–1973)
- Geoffrey Denis Erskine Russell, 4th Baron Ampthill (1921–2011)
- David Whitney Erskine Russell, 5th Baron Ampthill (b. 1947)

The heir presumptive is the present holder's brother, Anthony John Mark Russell (b. 1952).

== Family tree ==
Russell family tree: Barons Ampthill

Duke of Bedford
John Russell, 6th Duke of Bedford (1766–1839)
Earl Russell
Francis Russell, 7th Duke of Bedford (1788–1861) | Lord George William Russell (1790–1846) | Lord John Russell, 1st Earl Russell (1792–1878); P.M. 1846–52, 1865–66
BARON AMPTHILL, 1881
William Russell, 8th Duke of Bedford (1809–1872) | Francis Charles Hastings Russell, 9th Duke of Bedford (1819–1891) | Lord Odo William Leopold Russell, 1st Baron Ampthill (1829–1884) | John Russell, Viscount Amberley (1842–1876)
10th and subsequent Dukes of Bedford
Arthur Oliver Villiers Russell, 2nd Baron Ampthill (1869–1935) | Bertrand Arthur William Russell, 3rd Earl Russell (1872–1970); Philosopher
Christabel Hulme Hart (Note: First wife. Divorce proceedings by the 3rd Baron against her in 1922 failed. Divorce proceedings in 1923 succeeded but were overturned on appeal to the House of Lords in 1924. A divorce was finally granted in 1935, but the legitimacy of her son remained intact. (See Russell case.)) (1895–1976) | John Hugo Russell, 3rd Baron Ampthill (Note: Initiated divorce proceedings against his 1st wife in 1922 which failed and again in 1923 which succeeded until overturned by the House of Lords in 1924. His eldest son's, later the 4th Baron, legitimacy was confirmed by the action of the House of Lords. He ultimately succeeded in divorcing his 1st wife in 1935. (See Russell case.)) (1896–1973) | Adeline Mary Constance Hone (Note: Third wife, the second marriage failing to produce issue.) (1909–2004)
Geoffrey Denis Erskine Russell, 4th Baron Ampthill (Note: His father, through divorce proceedings, tried to have him declared illegitimate. The House of Lords disagreed and sided with his mother that he was the son of the 3rd Baron. (See Russell case.)) (1921–2011) | John Hugo Trenchard Russell (Note: John challenged Geoffrey Russell's right to inherit the Ampthill barony. In 1976, the House of Lords Committee For Privileges reported that the younger John had not made out his claim, so confirming Geoffrey as the 4th Baron Ampthill. (See Russell case.)) (born 1950)
David Whitney Erskine Russell, 5th Baron Ampthill (born 1947) | James Nicholas Geoffrey Russell (1948–1969) | Anthony John Mark Russell (born 1952) heir presumptive | Henry John Trenchard Russell (born 1977) | James Peter Faber Russell (born 1980)
William Odo Alexander Russell (born 1986) | William Russell (born 2010) | Oliver Odo Jonathan Russell (born 2010)

The 5th Baron is 4th cousin once removed of the 15th Duke of Bedford and is currently 16th in the line of succession to the dukedom.

== Line of succession ==
- Odo Russell, 1st Baron Ampthill (1829–1884)
  - Oliver Russell, 2nd Baron Ampthill(1869–1935)
    - Captain John Russell, 3rd Baron Ampthill (1896–1973)
      - Geoffrey Russell, 4th Baron Ampthill (1921–2011)
        - David Russell, 5th Baron Ampthill (b. 1947)
        - Hon. James Nicholas Geoffrey Russell (1948–1969)
        - (1) Hon. Anthony John Mark Russell (b. 1952)
          - (2) William Odo Alexander Russell (b. 1986)
      - (3) Hon. John Hugo Trenchard Russell (b. 1950)
        - (4) Henry John Trenchard Russell (b. 1977)
          - (5) William Russell (b. 2010)
        - (6) James Peter Faber Russell (b. 1980)
          - (7) Oliver Odo Jonathan Russell (b. 2010)
    - Adm Hon. Sir Guy Russell (1898–1977)
      - Dr. James Rowland Russell (1940–2015)
        - male issue in remainder
      - Oliver Henry Russell (b. 1942)
        - male issue in remainder
    - Wg Cdr Hon. Edward Wriothesley Curzon Russell (1901–1982)
      - male issue in remainder
    - Brig Hon. Leopold Oliver Russell (1907–1988)
      - male issue in remainder
  - Hon. Sir Odo William Theophilus Russell (1870–1951)
    - Cosmo Rex Ivor Russell (1911–2003)
      - male issue in remainder
    - Alaric Charles William Russell (1912–1986)
      - male issue in remainder
    - David Hastings Gerald Russell (1915–1999)
      - male issue in remainder
  - Hon. Victor Alexander Frederick Villiers Russell (1874–1965)
    - male issue in remainder
  - Hon. Alexander Victor Frederick Villiers Russell (1874–1965)
    - male issue in remainder

== See also ==
- Duke of Bedford
- Earl Russell
- Earl of Orford
- Russell case
