= Christabel Russell =

Dress shop entrepreneur; notorious divorcée

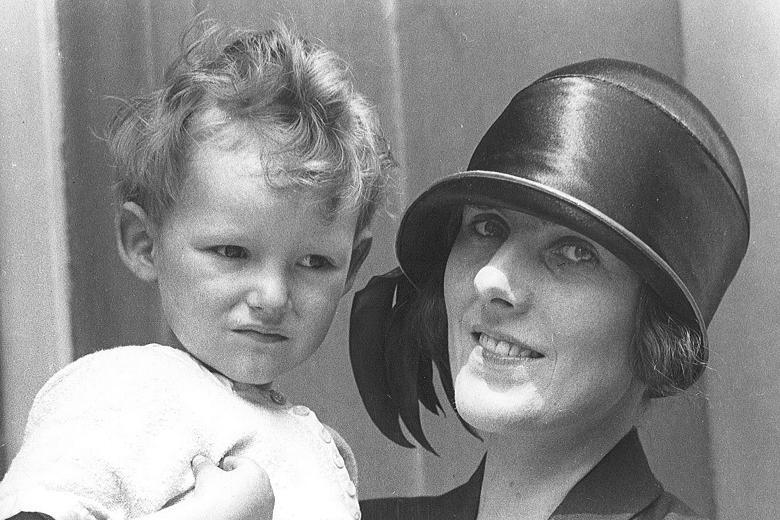
- Christabel Russell and son Geoffrey in 1924
- Born: Christabel Hulme Hart; 22 June 1895; Tadley, Hampshire, England, United Kingdom
- Died: 16 February 1976 (aged 80); Galway, Ireland
- Other names: Christabel, Baroness Ampthill
- Spouse: John Hugo Russell (m. 1918; div. 1937)
- Children: Geoffrey
- Parents: John Hart (father); Blanche Hart (née Erskine) (mother)

Christabel Russell (1895–1976), born Christabel Hulme Hart, started a successful fashionable dress shop in London in 1920. She designed the dresses herself and the business expanded to employ nearly forty staff. Before her marriage she habitually went to dances and parties and she received, and refused, many offers of marriage. She went on to become an accomplished horsewoman and in later life took to travelling the world.

However she is best known for her central role in a series of court cases starting in 1921, eventually reaching the House of Lords in 1924, in which her husband, John Russell, unsuccessfully attempted to divorce her on grounds of her alleged adultery. She gave birth to a son shortly before the first case came to court. Medical evidence was given that despite her pregnancy she was still a virgin and John Russell sought to prove he could not have been the father because he had never succeeded in having intercourse with his wife. Christabel spoke of "Hunnish scenes" in the bedroom on one of the rare occasions they shared a bed. (Note: Christabel's biographer Bevis Hillier writes that the expression "Hunnish scenes" derived from the First World War when it was a term of loathing used against the Germans. In the context of the Russells' divorce cases it became a subject of ribald jocularity. However Christabel's husband said she used the word to describe anything she did not like.) The newspapers were full of salacious details of the evidence given in court which appalled King George V and in 1926 a law was brought in to restrict reporting of divorce cases.

== Early life ==
Christabel Hulme Hart was born on 22 June 1895 to John Hart, colonel of the Leinster Regiment, and Blanche Hart (née Blanche Anstruther Erskine). (Note: 1895, the year of her birth. 22 June from "That happened on 21 June 1921; but he suddenly remembered that the next day was Christabel's birthday".) She started her childhood at Tadley in Hampshire but the family soon moved to Swallowfield in Berkshire. Her elder sister Gwnydd had been born in 1894 and the girls were taught at home by a governess though Christabel received most of her education from her father. Christabel learned to ride at the age of five and by the age of six could gallop on horseback away from her parents while fox hunting.

During the Great War she worked at Woolwich Arsenal making munitions and she became promoted to inspector of gun carriages, in charge of 2000 women workers at a salary of £400 (equivalent to £24,600 in 2023). Later she became buyer for the armaments company W G Armstrong Whitworth. In the evenings she partied and danced, this leading to many marriage proposals that she always accepted and then rejected a few days later. She claimed never to have been in love or to have had any romantic involvements.

Christabel was 5 feet 11 inches (1.80 m) tall and athletic, and was described as boyish but not mannish. In the 1920s she was very modern woman, a "flapper": highly fashionable in her speech, bobbed hairstyle and way of dressing. She was "exceedingly unconventional": driving a car and motorcycle and flying an aircraft. Most people considered her beautiful: she was certainly elegant and drew attention.

In 1915 three midshipmen from HMS Defence placed an advertisement in The Times seeking young ladies to correspond with. Such an idea would have been socially unacceptable before the war but it was now possible for unmarried young women to be companions for wartime officers who might not have long to live. (Note: In fact, only one week after the midshipmen had left the ship, HMS Defence sank with all hands lost.) Hundreds of letters arrived in reply and, after rejecting all who had not enclosed a photograph, the officers selected Christabel and arranged to meet her in London. For ten days the foursome dined and went to nightclubs for which one of the officers, John Russell paid for all the expenses. (Note: Sixty years later another of the officers wrote "It was terribly non-sexual. ... [Sex] wasn't something that occurred with girls of your own class until you were married".) Christabel stayed in contact with all three men and on 18 October 1918 she married Russell at St Jude's Church, Kensington. On the day before the wedding Christabel had made her fiancé promise there would be no sex and no children for at least a year or two. (Note: In December 1917 she had accepted a marriage proposal from Russell but next month wrote to him calling off the engagement. Later, but also before her eventual marriage, she had eloped to Edinburgh with another of the midshipmen, Gilbert Barclay. However they did not meet the Scottish residence requirements and returned still unmarried with Barclay angry that Christabel seemed somewhat relieved.) Russell's parents, Oliver Russell, 2nd Baron Ampthill and Margaret, Baroness Ampthill did not attend the wedding because they had heard rumours about her being "fast", (Note: "Fast" – 9b. depreciative. Of a woman: failing to abide by the social norms of behaviour, dress, speech, etc., specifically expected of women (now disused). In later use: sexually promiscuous. "fast". Oxford English Dictionary (Online ed.). Oxford University Press. (Subscription or participating institution membership required.)) fearing their son had got her pregnant, and thinking the marriage was beneath their dignity. (Note: Lady Ampthill was Woman of the Bedchamber to Queen Mary and cherished the hope of her son marrying the Princess Royal.) However, they did allow the couple to stay with them at their Oakley estate for part of their honeymoon.

The Russells moved to a small house in Chelsea and, with John mostly away on submarine duties, Christabel resumed her extensive socialising but without the awkwardness of marriage proposals. Her husband gave her the book Married Love by Marie Stopes in the forlorn hope it would improve their sexual relationship. Despite keeping her physical distance she seemed to love him romantically writing "I'm miserable without you and want to howl, how I wish you were here to put your arms around me and kiss my tears away ...".

== Career ==
The couple were not particularly well off, living off John's salary of £275 from Vickers (equivalent to £14,000 in 2023) and an annual allowance from his father of £100 (equivalent to £5,100 in 2023) so Christabel in 1920 opened a dress shop, Christabel Russell Ltd., in Curzon Street, Mayfair, designing most of the clothes herself. In 1923 she drew a salary of £400 (equivalent to £28,800 in 2023). The business was a success and came to employ nearly forty people.

At the time of their marriage, John Russell did not dance or visit nightclubs, which Christabel did all the time. They slept in separate bedrooms. Rather quickly the relationship broke down leading to a series of highly notorious court cases (see below). Christabel Russell's biographer Bevis Hillier considered that, because of the sensational news headlines, she became in 1924 the most famous woman in Britain, succeeding Lady Elizabeth Bowes-Lyon (1923) and preceding Agatha Christie (1926). (Note: Elizabeth Bowes-Lyon married the Duke of York, later George VI, in 1923. Agatha Christie famously went missing in 1926.) She published a novel Afraid of Love in 1925 with strong autobiographical overtones. Then she went on to write a screenplay for a film of the same name in which she appeared in the leading role, also starring Juliette Compton and Leslie Faber. The film was poorly received and no copy is known to have survived. She later designed the costumes for several films. In 1941 she designed Elizabeth Jane Howard's wedding trousseau, using parachute silk and curtain netting for the underwear because of the wartime conditions. She continued in charge of the dress shop for almost forty years while it remained highly successful.

== Marriage breakdown ==
In the course of the year 1920 the Russell's marriage deteriorated with John Russell sometimes being violent, threatening to shoot his wife, or indeed himself, and then becoming tearfully contrite. Over Christmas at the Ampthills' estate there was only one bed available so, unusually, they slept together. It was never known what happened that night but at their divorce case next year Christabel claimed she had become pregnant by her husband but he claimed this was completely impossible.

On 17 June 1921 at a session with a clairvoyant, Christabel Russell was told to her astonishment she was five months pregnant. Four days later a doctor confirmed the pregnancy and its timing but after examining her gynecologically said that he would have considered that she was still a virgin. Quite coincidentally, and before his wife had told him of her pregnancy, Russell had been to his solicitor on 21 June to see about obtaining a divorce. On 23 June the couple met and when Christabel told him her news he was delighted, not doubting that he was, mysteriously, the father, and she shared in his pleasure. It was only much later, at the trial for divorce, that she told her husband she was still, technically, a virgin.

Lady Ampthill greeted her son's paternity with disbelief and succeeded in persuading Russell that he could not be the father and that Christabel must have been unfaithful to him. They agreed to live separately, she with her mother. By July the Ampthills' solicitors notified Christabel that divorce proceedings would be taken against her on grounds of her adultery and citing two named co-respondents (one of them one of the other naval officers from the 1915 partying) as well as a man unknown. The court case could not commence for almost a year and on 15 October 1921 Christabel gave birth to a boy who was named Geoffrey. She wrote to her husband, adamant the child could only be his and hoping to restore the marriage, but Russell did not reply. The dress shop thrived, partly on account of curious customers but Christabel accepted her solicitors' advice not to be seen out alone with any man. The birth of her child affected her feelings: she wrote to her husband "It is extraordinary how it changes ones outlook having a baby... I feel quite different".

=== First divorce case ===
The divorce trial commenced in July 1922 and was reported on in detail in the press. Russell's parents hired a very strong legal team including Sir John Simon and Douglas Hogg (later the first Lord Hailsham). Christabel and the named co-respondents were also well represented. Simon's opening statement was very aggressive, so much so that, when he claimed that the marriage had not been consummated and that the couple shared a dislike of contraceptives, one of the two women jurors became distressed and needed to be discharged. The judge, Sir Henry Duke, felt the presence of women on the jury was helpful in such a difficult case, and was relieved when the other woman thought she could continue.

One witness said that Christabel had spoken to her of becoming pregnant through "Hunnish scenes" in the bedroom. Christabel's counsel claimed that, as a matter of law deriving from a case in 1777, if a husband and wife are living together at the relevant time, the child is the husband's and any contrary evidence he may give should not be heard by the court. Christabel was asked under cross-examination about the "Hunnish scenes" and she said these referred to occasions of "incomplete relations". (Note: "Hunnish scenes" are referred to by Hillier as: "Simon also mocked Christabel's melodramatic phrase 'Hunnish scenes'. She said that the expression referred to the occasions when there bad been incomplete relations between John Hugo and herself. She was now told that the child had been begotten as a result of these relations ...") The baby was produced for the jury to inspect (Note: It was not until 1939 that courts in England approved paternity testing using blood groups.) and the clairvoyant gave evidence that she was a "psychological expert", not a fortune-teller, and her diagnosis was possible by detecting Christabel's "vibrations of the hormones". Eventually, and after the case had lasted 16 days, the jury found Christabel had not committed adultery with either of the two named co-respondents but could not agree concerning the man unknown. The named co-respondents were dismissed from the case, with costs, and the Ampthills had to bear their costs and most of those of Christabel.

King George V was outraged by the press coverage of the case and this added impetus to the existing pressure for press restrictions, so leading to the 1926 Judicial Proceedings Act which banned publication of "any indecent matter" in divorce cases.

=== Second divorce case and appeals to High Court and House of Lords ===
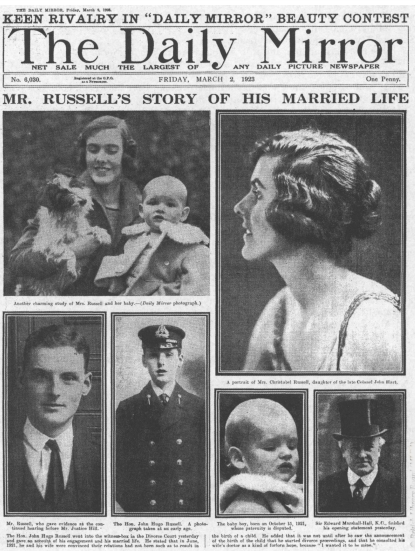
Daily Mirror, 2 March 1923

In 1923 John Russell brought a second divorce case with amended grounds, with Sir Edward Marshall Hall as counsel, claiming that, in addition, his wife had frequently committed adultery with Edgar Mayer. The details of the Russells' marriage were admitted in evidence all over again giving the press another opportunity to report. The doctor who had originally diagnosed the pregnancy gave evidence that as well as being pregnant she "showed signs of virginity" and this was confirmed by a second doctor giving evidence. Under cross-examination Christabel said that at the time of her marriage she did not know what intercourse was but she did know that men were physically different from women because she had been an art student and had studied anatomy from the age of twelve. When asked by Marshall Hall "Have you never had the smallest curiosity to know what that portion of the man's body was intended by nature for?" she replied "I had not the smallest curiosity". Marshall Hall: "Do you know that that in moments of passion that portion of a man's body gets large?" – "I did not know that". Marshall Hall: "Do you know that now?" – "You have just told me". Despite all this the jury found that she had committed adultery with the man unknown and John was granted a decree nisi. The outcome of this case caused much surprise in the press and among the involved barristers. Marshall Hall thought that, as in the first case, the "mother fighting for her child" would sway the jury. However her intellectual strength and rapier wit in the witness box may have counted against her.

Christabel Russell's appeal against this verdict was unanimously dismissed by the three judges of the High Court with costs awarded against her. She then appealed to House of Lords in 1924 where five law lords heard the case: lords Finlay, Birkenhead, Dunedin, Carson and Sumner. By a majority they concluded that, under established English law, a husband or wife is not permitted to give evidence that their child, though born in wedlock, is actually illegitimate. Hence the husband's evidence that he had never had intercourse with his wife should not have been allowed in court, the appeal court had been in error, and there had been no admissible evidence of adultery. The upshot was that the couple remained legally married and the child remained the couple's.

=== Court case concerning legitimacy of Geoffrey Russell ===
Christabel Russell's husband was still denying he was the father of her son Geoffrey so another court case led to the judge, Rigby Swift, issuing a decree in 1926: "I decree and declare that the petitioner Geoffrey Denis Erskine Russell is the lawful child of his parents, the Hon. John Russell and Christabel Hulme Russell".

== Later life ==
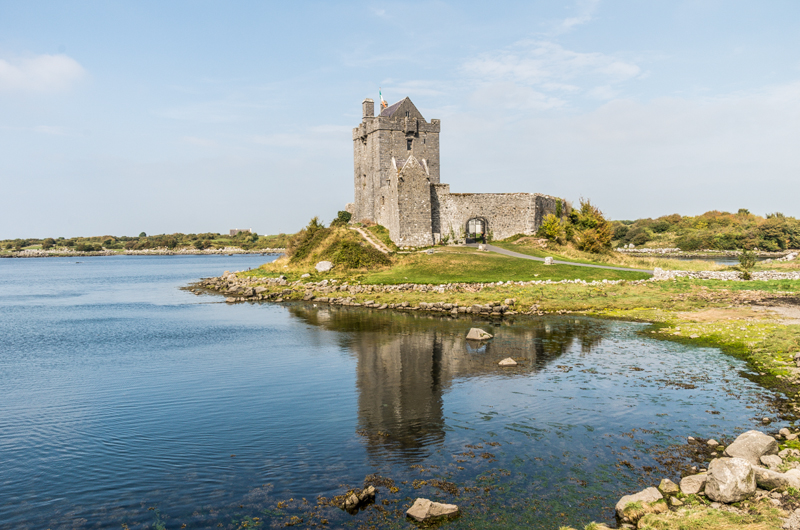
Dunguaire Castle in County Galway

In 1935 John Russell's father, the 2nd Lord Ampthill, died so Christabel became Lady Ampthill whereupon she petitioned for divorce, which became absolute in 1937.

In the 1930s Christabel had at least two men who her close relatives regarded as her "boyfriends", one of them the dashing Charles de Beaumont, a champion fencer who years later still kept her photograph on which he had written "Chris Ampthill, my great girlfriend in the 1930s". De Beaumont's son did not think his father "would have been satisfied with a platonic relationship". Nancy Mitford, in writing The Pursuit of Love in 1945, referred to "the Russell case" assuming her readers would still at least have heard of it.

In 1957 Christabel emigrated to County Meath in Ireland where she became Master of the Ballymacaid Hunt before moving to live in Dunguaire Castle in County Galway which she purchased from Oliver St John Gogarty. She regularly rode with several fox hunts so she could hunt seven days a week when she chose, riding sidesaddle and wearing a beaver hat and riding habit. She befriended the five or six year old Anjelica Huston, and took her riding and hunting. Huston recalled "She spoke in the slow, emphatic English of the Anglo upper class. Her stature, the way she held herself, was something from the eighteenth century. It led to the idea that she was aloof; but she wasn't, she was sweet. She was very welcoming". Eventually Huston based her portrayal of Mrs Rattery in A Handful of Dust on her.

John Russell died in 1973 and the press announced that his son with Christabel, Geoffrey Russell, would succeed to the peerage. However, after his first marriage the third Lord Ampthill married twice again and by his third wife in 1950 he had another son, who was also called John and now claimed the peerage for himself. At the time this news broke Christabel was in Australia as part of travelling solo around the world so she started to drive back to England in her car. It seemed blood tests might be required so the ambassador in Tehran was written to (Note: Attempts to reach Christabel in Madras, Delhi, Lahore and Kabul had all failed.) asking him to hand her a letter requesting her to provide a blood sample for analysis. Geoffrey also wrote to his mother to say that a friend from years ago, Eileen Hunter, had just published a biography Christabel: the Russell case and after which he described as "It is just as dreadful as we all expected it would be". The Attorney General decided that, since the divorce issues had previously reached the House of Lords, they should decide the matter on this occasion as well, this time via a referral to the Lords' Committee for Privileges and Conduct. Christabel died of a massive stroke in a Galway hospital on 16 February 1976, exactly a week before the hearings began. The committee unanimously decided that Geoffrey, not John, was the rightful 4th Baron Ampthill.
