= Margaret Russell, Baroness Ampthill =

British noblewoman (1874–1957)

The Right Honourable The Lady Ampthill CI GCVO GBE DStJ
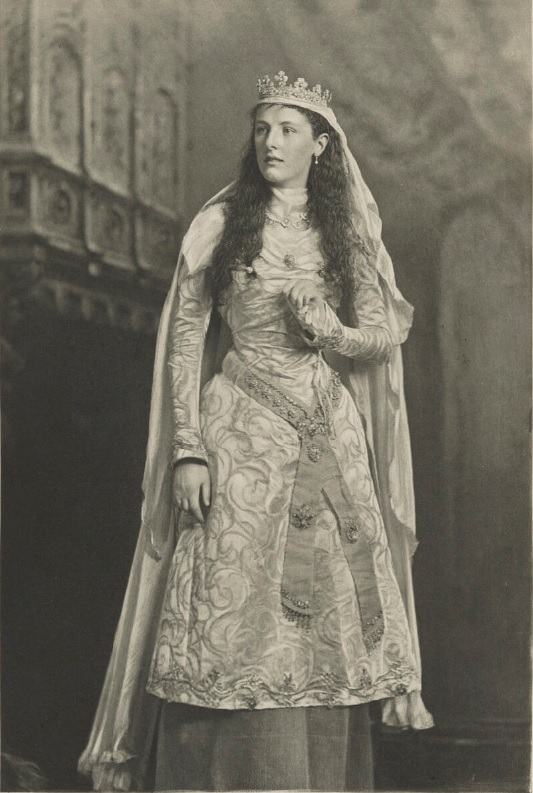
- Dressed as a character from Arthurian legend and photographed in 1897 by James Lafayette

Lady of the Bedchamber
- In office 1911 – 24 March 1953
- Queen: Mary of Teck

Personal details
- Born: 8 October 1874 London, England
- Died: 12 December 1957 (aged 83) London, England
- Spouse: Oliver Russell, 2nd Baron Ampthill (m. 1894; died 1935)
- Children: 5, including John and Guy
- Parents: Frederick Lygon, 6th Earl Beauchamp (father); Lady Mary Stanhope (mother)

Margaret Russell, Baroness Ampthill, CI, GCVO, GBE, DStJ (née Lady Margaret Lygon; 8 October 1874 – 12 December 1957) was an English courtier and Red Cross volunteer, known for her long friendship with Mary of Teck, Queen of the United Kingdom.

== Life and career ==
Russell was born at 13, Belgrave Square, London, to Frederick Lygon, 6th Earl Beauchamp and Lady Mary Stanhope, daughter of Philip Stanhope, 5th Earl Stanhope. She married the 2nd Baron Ampthill, a civil servant, in 1894.

Lord Ampthill served as Governor of Madras from 1900 to 1906. Lady Ampthill was appointed a Companion of the Order of the Crown of India in 1900 and awarded a gold Kaisar-i-Hind Medal in 1906.

Lady Ampthill first became friends with Queen Mary in 1891, when she was known as Princess May. Lady Margaret was appointed a Lady of the Bedchamber to Queen Mary in 1911, but was honoured by four monarchs for her charity work.

In 1918, she was appointed a Dame Grand Cross of the Order of the British Empire for her work with the Red Cross during the First World War and a Dame Grand Cross of the Royal Victorian Order in 1946 for her work as a courtier. She was also a Dame of Grace of the Venerable Order of Saint John of Jerusalem.

She died in hospital in London after a long illness. After her death, Viscount Templewood eulogised her in The Times and commented on her friendship with Queen Mary:

The Queen and her Lady-in-Waiting could not have been better matched. Even in appearance they seemed specially designed for each other. Tall, dignified without being stiff, agreeable and sociable, with just that measure of reserve that adds distinction to personality, living examples of the rare art of deportment, each seemed to enhance the virtues of the other. It was qualities such as these that made King George's court a model of all courts and added to it a cachet of peculiar excellence. Friendship grew spontaneously in this fostering atmosphere, and quickly and surely the official relation between the Queen and her lady was transmuted into an intimate companionship that was only broken by Queen Mary's death.

— Viscount Templewood, The Times, 1957

== Issue ==
Lady Margaret married Oliver Russell, 2nd Baron Ampthill in Madresfield, Worcestershire on 6 October 1894, two days before her 20th birthday. The Ampthills had four sons and one daughter:

- John Russell, 3rd Baron Ampthill (1896–1973), succeeded his father
- Admiral Hon. Sir Guy Herbrand Edward Russell (1898–1977), Royal Navy commander
- Wing Commander Hon. Edward Wriothesley Curzon Russell OBE (2 June 1901 – 1982), married Baroness Barbara Korff and had issue
- Brig Hon. Leopold Oliver Russell OBE TD (26 January 1907 – 1988)
- Hon. Phyllis Margaret Russell OBE (3 June 1909 – c. 16 April 1998), Lady-in-Waiting to Princess Mary, married William George Preston Thorold (annulled 1942)

She died in Hammersmith, London, aged 83.

== Arms ==
Coat of arms of Margaret Russell, Baroness Ampthill
Escutcheon Oliver Russell, 2nd Baron Ampthill (Argent a lion rampant Gules on a chief Sable three escallops Argent a mullet Or for difference) impaling Frederick Lygon, 6th Earl Beauchamp (Argent two lions passant in pale tails fourchée Gules). Supporters Dexter a lion sinister a heraldic antelope both Gules the latter ducally gorged lined armed and unguled Or and each charged with a mullet Or for difference.
