= Geoffrey Russell, 4th Baron Ampthill =

British soldier, businessman and peer (1921–2011)

The Right Honourable The Lord Ampthill CBE, PC
- Lord Ampthill in 2008

Member of the House of Lords
- Lord Temporal
- Hereditary peerage 21 May 1976 – 11 November 1999
- Preceded by: The 3rd Baron Ampthill
- Succeeded by: Seat abolished
- Elected Hereditary Peer; 11 November 1999 – 23 April 2011
- Election: 1999
- Preceded by: Seat established
- Succeeded by: The 5th Viscount Colville of Culross

Personal details
- Born: Geoffrey Denis Erskine Russell; 15 October 1921
- Died: 23 April 2011 (aged 89)
- Party: Crossbench
- Spouse(s): (1) Susan Winn; (2) Elisabeth Mallon
- Children: 4, including David
- Parent: John Russell, 3rd Baron Ampthill (father)
- Education: Stowe School

Geoffrey Denis Erskine Russell, 4th Baron Ampthill (15 October 1921 – 23 April 2011), was a British hereditary peer and businessman, whose paternity and succession to the peerage were disputed in the "Ampthill baby case".

His father, John Russell, 3rd Baron Ampthill, had petitioned to disclaim paternity whilst divorcing Russell's mother, Christabel Hulme Hart, in 1923, claiming non-consummation. The petition was rejected on appeal and Russell's mother was granted a declaration that he was legitimate.

Educated at Stowe School, Russell served in the Irish Guards during the Second World War, being commissioned as a captain in 1941. He served with the Guards Armoured Division in France in 1944, where he was wounded, and in Norway in 1945.

Russell was general manager of Fortnum & Mason from 1947 until resigning in 1951, then chairman of the New Providence Hotel until 1965. He made a career in theatrical management as owner/managing director of Linnet & Dunfee (which produced the original production of the musical hit Salad Days) from 1953 until 1981. He was afterwards a director of United Newspapers and Express Newspapers. He was also Chairman of London's Helicopter Emergency Service.

Russell succeeded as Baron Ampthill in 1973, upon the death of his father. His succession was unsuccessfully contested by his half-brother John Hugo Trenchard Russell, eldest son of the 3rd Baron's third marriage. The Committee for Privileges ruled in favour of Geoffrey in 1976.

In the House of Lords, Ampthill sat as a crossbencher. He was a deputy speaker from 1983 and Chairman of Committees from 1992 to 1994. He was appointed a CBE in 1986—following in the footsteps of his father who was also appointed a CBE—and made a Privy Counsellor in 1995. Following the passage of the House of Lords Act 1999 which removed the majority of hereditary peers from the House, Ampthill was one of the ninety hereditaries elected to continue to sit. He was one of fifteen peers elected by the whole house to be available to serve as deputy speakers and office holders.

In 1946, Ampthill married Susan Winn, a granddaughter of the 2nd Baron St Oswald and of the 1st Baron Queenborough, whom he divorced in 1971; they had three sons and a daughter. He then married Elisabeth Mallon in 1972, divorcing her in 1987. He was succeeded in the title by his first-born son David Russell.

Parliament of the United Kingdom
Preceded by The Lord Aberdare	Chairman of Committees of the House of Lords; 1992–1994	Succeeded by The Lord Boston of Faversham
New office created by the House of Lords Act 1999	Elected hereditary peer to the House of Lords under the House of Lords Act 1999; 1999–2011	Succeeded by The Viscount Colville of Culross
Peerage of the United Kingdom
Preceded by John Russell	Baron Ampthill; 1973–2011; Member of the House of Lords (1976–1999)	Succeeded by David Russell
