= Sigglesthorne =

Village and civil parish in the East Riding of Yorkshire, England

Coordinates: 53.894921°N 0.243090°W

- Location within the East Riding of Yorkshire
- Population: 404 (2011 census)
- OS grid reference: TA155457
- Civil parish: Sigglesthorne
- Unitary authority: East Riding of Yorkshire
- Ceremonial county: East Riding of Yorkshire
- Region: Yorkshire and the Humber
- Country: England
- Sovereign state: United Kingdom
- Post town: HULL
- Postcode district: HU11
- Dialling code: 01964
- Police: Humberside
- Fire: Humberside
- Ambulance: Yorkshire
- UK Parliament: Bridlington and The Wolds

Sigglesthorne is a small village and civil parish in the East Riding of Yorkshire, England. It is situated approximately 3 miles (4.8 km) west of Hornsea on the A1035 road (formerly B1244) where it meets the B1243 road.

According to the 2011 UK census, Sigglesthorne parish had a population of 404, an increase on the 2001 UK census figure of 282.

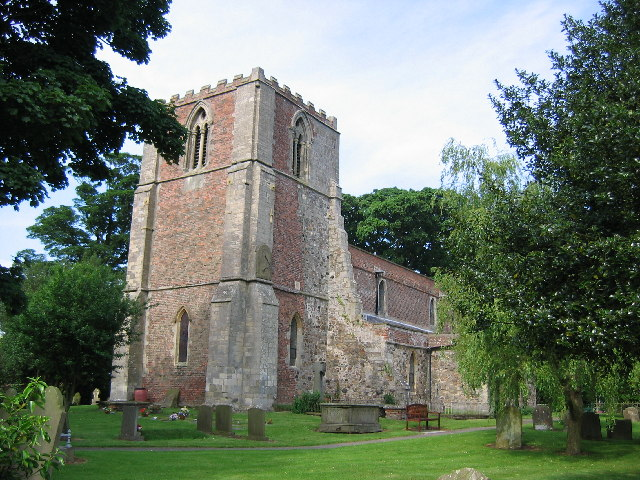
Church of St Lawrence, Sigglesthorne

The village has around 175 houses. There is also an ancient church dedicated to St. Lawrence that was designated a Grade II* listed building in 1966 and is now recorded in the National Heritage List for England, maintained by Historic England. There is also a Church of England school.

The name Sigglesthorne derives from the Old Norse Sigelsþorn meaning 'Sigel's thorn tree'.

== See also ==
- Listed buildings in Sigglesthorne
