= Wassand Hall =

Country house in Yorkshire

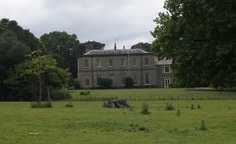
- Wassand Hall, East Riding of Yorkshire
- Interactive map of the Wassand Hall area

General information
- Type: Regency country house
- Architectural style: Regency and Neoclassical
- Location: Seaton, near Hornsea, England
- Coordinates: 53.8962°N 0.2078°W
- Completed: 1815 (incorporating 16th/17th-century foundations)
- Client: Rev. Charles Constable
- Owner: Strickland-Constable family trust

Technical details
- Material: white brick with stone dressings

Design and construction
- Architect: Richard Creyke

Listed Building – Grade II*
- Designated: 16 December 1966
- Reference no.: 1249398

Wassand Hall is an early 19th-century Regency country house and Grade II* listed building situated in the township of Seaton, near Hornsea in the East Riding of Yorkshire, England. The hall sits in landscaped parkland overlooking Hornsea Mere, the largest natural freshwater lake in Yorkshire, which forms part of the estate.

The present house was completed in 1815 to designs by the architect Richard Creyke, replacing an earlier Elizabethan manor house on the same site. It has remained in the ownership of the Constable family and their descendants, the Strickland-Constables, since 1530.

== History ==
=== Medieval manor and the Constable family ===
The manor of Wassand (historically spelt Wassande) was recorded following the Norman Conquest as part of the lordship of Holderness held by Drogo of la Beuvrière. In 1530, the estate was purchased by Jane Constable, widow of Sir Robert Constable of Flamborough, establishing an unbroken family lineage at Wassand spanning nearly five centuries.

During the Tudor and Stuart eras, the Constables maintained a substantial Elizabethan brick manor house surrounded by a moat. During the English Civil War, Sir William Constable, 1st Baronet, of Flamborough, was a prominent Parliamentarian commander and a signatory to the death warrant of King Charles I, though the Wassand branch of the family remained relatively detached from regicide politics.

=== Regency rebuilding (1813–1815) ===
By the early 19th century, the old Elizabethan hall was deemed structurally unsound and out of architectural fashion. In 1813, the Reverend Charles Constable commissioned his nephew, the amateur architect Richard Creyke, to design a new seat in the fashionable Regency style.

The earlier manor was demolished, though its stone foundations and cellars were retained to support the new building, which was completed in 1815. The surrounding estate grounds were simultaneously re-landscaped to take advantage of views across Hornsea Mere.

=== Later history and modern estate ===
In the 20th century, the estate passed to the Strickland-Constable baronets of Flamborough. During the Second World War, the parkland hosted defensive installations and military exercises defending the Holderness coast. It also hosted troops of the Free French.

Following the death of Sir Henry Strickland-Constable, 11th Baronet, in 1975, the hall and estate were placed in a family trust. The estate remains a private residence but opens its principal rooms, walled gardens, and woodland walks to the public on select summer days.

== Architecture ==
Wassand Hall is built of pale cream white brick laid in Flemish bond with fine stone dressings and a hipped slate roof hidden behind a low stone parapet.

=== Exterior ===
The South (Principal) Elevation is a symmetrical five-bay, two-storey façade. The central three bays project slightly and feature a central entrance doorway flanked by Greek Doric columns supporting a plain entablature. The East Elevation features a prominent bow window rising through both storeys, providing panoramic views across the park towards Hornsea Mere. Windows consist of tall 12-pane sash windows to the ground floor and square 6-pane sashes to the upper floor, set in plain stone surrounds.

=== Interior ===
The interior is noted for its compact, well-proportioned Regency interior architecture and collection of fine arts. The Entrance Hall features a cantilevered stone staircase with simple wrought-iron balusters and a mahogany handrail lit by a central glass dome. The Drawing Room and Dining Room decor features delicate Neo-classical plasterwork cornices, white marble fireplaces, and an extensive collection of 17th- and 18th-century English and Dutch portraits, including works by Peter Lely and Thomas Gainsborough. The hall houses a notable collection of 18th-century English porcelain, including early Chelsea, Bow, and Derby pieces.

== Grounds and Hornsea Mere ==
The hall sits within 40 hectares of Grade II listed historic parkland. The grounds feature a restored 18th-century walled kitchen garden featuring Victorian greenhouses, herbaceous borders, and trained fruit trees. The estate includes ownership of Hornsea Mere, a Site of Special Scientific Interest (SSSI) and a key regional habitat for wildfowl and wintering birds. There are also severaal woodland walks that were planted in the early 19th century with beech, oak, and lime avenues framing vistas of the lake.

The house is not open full-time to the public, but details of Open Days can be found on the Wassand Hall website.

== In popular culture ==
Wassand Hall and Hornsea Mere have featured in regional heritage broadcasting and historical literature:

- All Creatures Great and Small (BBC): Filming crews used the parkland avenues and surrounding Holderness lanes for country driving scenes in regional television shoots.
- Regional Screen Productions: The hall’s Regency interiors and walled gardens have served as backdrops for regional heritage documentaries produced by BBC Yorkshire and ITV Yorkshire, focusing on East Riding landed estates.

== See also ==
- Grade II* listed buildings in the East Riding of Yorkshire
- Listed buildings in Seaton, East Riding of Yorkshire
- Strickland-Constable baronets
- Hornsea Mere
