= Lady Emily Russell =

British courtier (1843–1927)

The Right Honourable The Lady Ampthill VA
- Lady Ampthill in 1896
- Born: Emily Theresa Villiers; 9 September 1843
- Died: 22 February 1927 (aged 83)
- Noble family: Villiers family (by birth); Russell family (by marriage)
- Spouse: Odo Russell, 1st Baron Ampthill (m. 1868; died 1884)
- Father: George Villiers, 4th Earl of Clarendon
- Mother: Lady Katherine Foster-Barham

Emily Theresa Russell, Baroness Ampthill, VA (9 September 1843 – 22 February 1927) was a British courtier.

Born Lady Emily Theresa Villiers, she was the third daughter of George Villiers, 4th Earl of Clarendon and his wife, Katherine (née Grimston, formerly Foster-Barham), eldest daughter of James Grimston, 1st Earl of Verulam. She was a bridesmaid to Princess Alexandra of Denmark on the latter's marriage to the Edward, Prince of Wales in 1863.

On 5 May 1868, she married Odo Russell (son of Lord George Russell) at Watford and they had six children:

- Arthur Oliver Villiers Russell, 2nd Baron Ampthill (1869–1935)
- Hon. Odo William Theopilus Villiers Russell (1870–1951)
- Hon. Constance Evelyn Villiers Russell (1872–1942)
- Hon. Alexander Victor Frederick Villiers Russell (1874–1965)
- Hon. Victor Alexander Frederick Villiers Russell (1874–1965)
- Hon. Augusta Louise Margaret Romola Villiers Russell (1879–1966)

In 1881, Odo was created Baron Ampthill. In 1885, the now Baroness Ampthill became a Lady of the Bedchamber to Queen Victoria and was later appointed to the Royal Order of Victoria and Albert for her services.

In 1897, she was one of the guests at the Duchess of Devonshire’s Diamond Jubilee Costume Ball.

Court offices
| Preceded by The Lady Abercromby | Lady of the Bedchamber; 1885–1901 | Succeeded by None (death of Queen Victoria) |
