= Guy Russell =

Royal Navy Admiral (1898-1977)

Admiral The Honourable Sir Guy Russell GBE KCB DSO
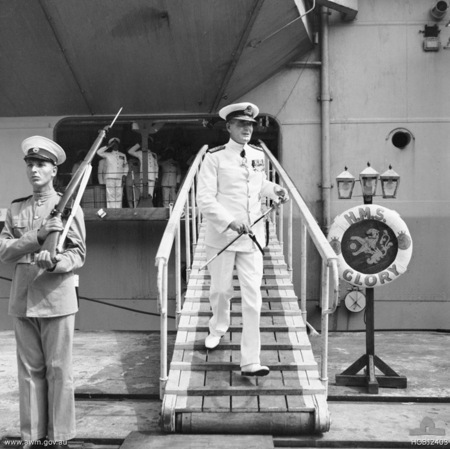
- Vice Admiral Sir Guy Russell, Commander-in-Chief Far East Station, leaves his old flagship HMS Glory in Kure, Japan, September 1951
- Born: 14 April 1898; St George Hanover Square, London
- Died: 25 September 1977 (aged 79); Wisborough Green, Sussex
- Military career
- Allegiance: United Kingdom
- Branch: Royal Navy
- Service years: 1911–1958
- Rank: Admiral
- Commands: Imperial Defence College (1956–58); Far East Fleet (1951–53); Admiral Commanding, Reserves (1949–51); 2nd Cruiser Squadron (1948–49); HMS Duke of York (1943–44); HMS Nelson (1943); HMS Cumberland (1940–41); HMS Protector (1939)
- Conflicts: First World War; Second World War; Korean War
- Awards: Knight Grand Cross of the Order of the British Empire; Knight Commander of the Order of the Bath; Distinguished Service Order; Mentioned in Despatches (3); Order of St. Olav (Norway)

Admiral Sir Guy Herbrand Edward Russell, GBE, KCB, DSO (14 April 1898 – 25 September 1977) was a senior Royal Navy officer. He served as Commander-in-Chief, Far East Fleet from 1951 to 1953 during the Korean War, Second Sea Lord from 1953 to 1955, and Commandant of the Imperial Defence College from 1956 until his retirement in 1958.

== Early life ==
Born on 14 April 1899 in St George Hanover Square, London, Russell was the second son of Oliver Russell, 2nd Baron Ampthill, and his wife Margaret. Educated at Stonehouse School, Russell entered the Royal Navy in 1911 and attended the Royal Naval College, Osborne and Dartmouth.

== Naval career ==
During the First World War, Russell went to sea as a midshipman aboard HMS Implacable, which supported the Dardanelles landings. He would later serve aboard HMS Royal Oak during the Battle of Jutland, and was mentioned in despatches for his war service.

Russell saw service on a variety of ships, destroyers, cruisers, battleships, shore training establishments, and on the staff of the Commander-in-Chief Mediterranean, before his relatively early promotion to commander in 1931. This well-rounded record was combined with a reputation for adaptiveness and innovation. He completed the naval staff course at Royal Naval College, Greenwich in 1931 and became executive officer of HMS Queen Elizabeth, flagship of the Mediterranean fleet under Sir William Fisher. Russell continued to excel in this position, and was promoted to captain in 1936. After further studies at the Imperial Defence College, Russell became Assistant Director of Plans in 1938.

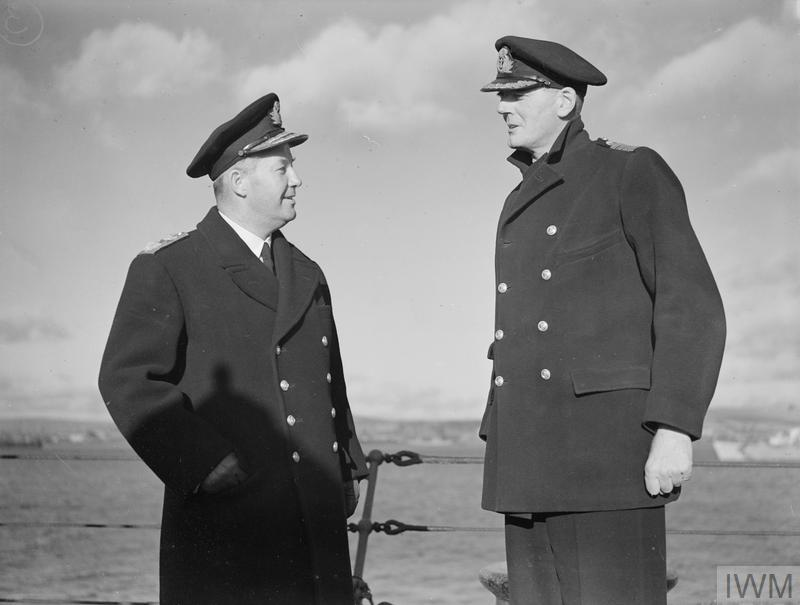
Russell with Arthur William La Touche Bisset (left) at Rosyth, November 1943.

On the outbreak of the Second World War, Russell first commanded the net layer HMS Protector, and then the cruiser HMS Cumberland. In late 1941, Russell became naval liaison officer to the Governor of Gibraltar, Viscount Gort, and subsequently followed Gort to Malta as his chief of staff. After the relief of the island by Operation Stone Age, Russell would move on to command HMS Nelson and then HMS Duke of York, flagship of the Home Fleet. It was under his command that Duke of York sank the Scharnhorst at the Battle of North Cape, and he was awarded the Distinguished Service Order as a result, having already been twice mentioned in despatches during the war. A year later, he was appointed to a staff position, naval assistant to the Second Sea Lord, and promoted rear admiral in 1945. He was made a Commander of the Order of the British Empire in 1943.

Russell returned to the Imperial Defence College from 1946 until 1948, was appointed a Companion of the Order of the Bath that year, and then spent a year commanding the 2nd Cruiser Squadron of Home Fleet, earning the respect of the then Commander-in-Chief, Sir Rhoderick McGrigor. Admiral Commanding, Reserves until 1951, he was then appointed Commander-in-Chief, Far East Fleet and made a Knight Commander of the Order of the Bath. He served on that station until 1953, taking part in the Korean War, and was promoted admiral in 1952. Returning from the Far East, he was made a Knight Grand Cross of the Order of the British Empire and served as Second Sea Lord and Chief of Naval Personnel until 1955. Russell's acute intelligence and bluff but kindly manner, combined with his broad experience, served him well in this position. He was Commandant of the Imperial Defence College from 1956 until his retirement in 1958.

== Later life ==
After retiring, Russell devoted himself to education and the training of young people, at Wellington College, Cranleigh School, Gordon Boys' School, and Radley College. An excellent oarsman (like his father), avid golfer and good shot, he died at his home in Wisborough Green in 1977.

== Family ==
He married (Helen) Elizabeth Blades, daughter of Rowland Blades, 1st Baron Ebbisham, in 1939. They had two sons and a daughter:

- Dr. James Rowland Russell (28 March 1940 – 2 March 2015) married and left children.
- Oliver Henry Russell (b. 7 May 1942) married to Clare Macpherson-Grant, cookbook author, and has children. The elder son has assumed his mother's family name.
- Margaret Elizabeth Russell (b. 11 October 1945) married and has children.

Military offices
| Preceded by Sir Patrick Brind | Commander-in-Chief, Far East Fleet; 1951–1953 | Succeeded by Sir Charles Lambe |
| Preceded by Sir Alexander Madden | Second Sea Lord; 1953–1955 | Succeeded by Sir Charles Lambe |
| Preceded by Sir Arthur Sanders | Commandant of the Imperial Defence College; 1956–1958 | Succeeded by Sir Geoffrey Bourne |
Honorary titles
| Preceded by Sir John Edelsten | First and Principal Naval Aide-de-Camp; 1954–1958 | Succeeded by Sir Guy Grantham |
