= Oliver Russell, 2nd Baron Ampthill =

British peer, colonial administrator and civil servant

The Right Honourable The Lord Ampthill GCSI GCIE
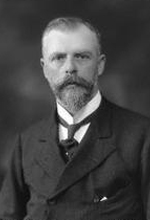
- Ampthill in 1921

Viceroy and Governor-General of India Acting
- In office 30 April 1904 – 13 December 1904
- Preceded by: The Lord Curzon of Kedleston
- Succeeded by: The Lord Curzon of Kedleston

Governor of Madras
- In office 15 October 1900 – 30 April 1904
- Governor-General: The Lord Curzon of Kedleston
- Succeeded by: Sir James Thompson (acting)
- In office 13 December 1904 – 15 February 1906
- Governor-General: George Curzon, 1st Marquess Curzon of Kedleston
- Preceded by: Sir James Thompson (acting)
- Succeeded by: Sir Gabriel Stokes (acting)

Personal details
- Born: 19 February 1869 Rome, Papal States (now Italy)
- Died: 7 July 1935 (aged 66) United Kingdom
- Party: Liberal Unionist, Conservative
- Spouse: Lady Margaret Lygon (m. 1894)
- Children: 5, including John and Guy
- Parent(s): Odo Russell, 1st Baron Ampthill; Lady Emily Villiers

Arthur Oliver Villiers Russell, 2nd Baron Ampthill, GCSI GCIE (19 February 1869 – 7 July 1935) was a British peer and civil servant. He served as Governor of Madras from October 1900 to February 1906, and as acting Viceroy of India from April to December 1904.

Russell served as the Assistant Private Secretary to Joseph Chamberlain from 1895 to 1897, and as Private Secretary to the same from 1897 to 1900, when he was appointed Governor of Madras. Russell also served as the Viceroy of India from April 1904 to December 1904, when Lord Curzon periodically returned to England.

== Early life ==
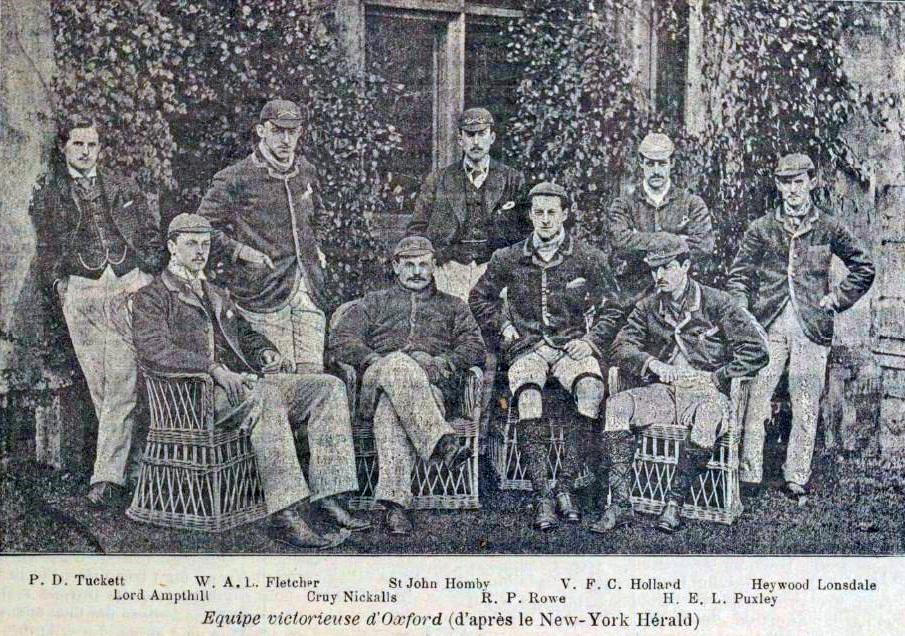
The winning Oxford crew of the 1890 Boat Race. Lord Ampthill is pictured second from the left, seated

(Arthur) Oliver Villiers Russell was born on 19 February 1869 in Rome. He was the eldest son of Odo Russell, 1st Baron Ampthill, and Lady Emily Theresa (née Villiers), who was Lady of the Bedchamber to Queen Victoria and daughter of the 4th Earl of Clarendon. Russell succeeded to the barony of Ampthill at the age of 15 on the death of his father. He was educated at Chignell's, Eton College, and New College, Oxford, from which he graduated in 1892 with a third-class honours in modern history. He rowed with the Oxford crew that won the 1890 Boat Race. His entry in Vanity Fair noted of him:

He is a very tall, very agreeable, and good-looking young man, with a long, strong back, which is worth much in a boat. He is a Freemason and a Liberal Unionist, though he has not yet become famous in the House of Lords. He intends to devote himself to the management of Foreign Affairs. He can shoot. He has many friends who call him "Dick."

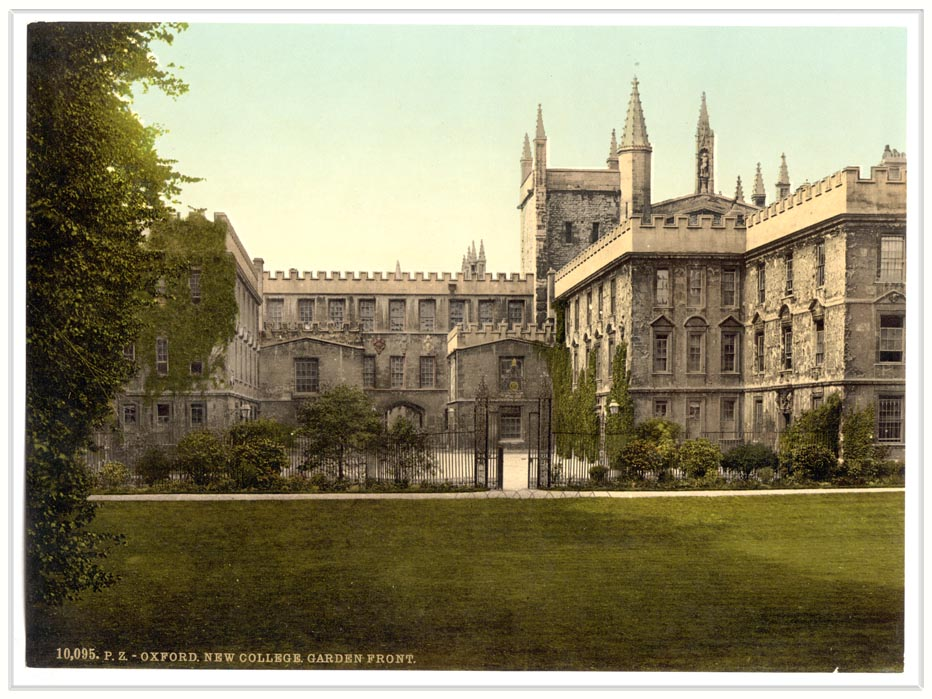
Russell was educated at New College, Oxford

He was commissioned into the part-time Royal 1st Devon Yeomanry as a Second lieutenant on 30 January 1892 and was promoted to Lieutenant on 21 March 1893. He left in 1897.

== Political career ==
In 1895, Russell was appointed Assistant Secretary to the Colonial Secretary, Joseph Chamberlain: in 1897, he was promoted to Private Secretary, but did not continue in this position as a consequence of his sympathy with the natives of South- and East- Africa, and of India.

=== Governor of Madras ===
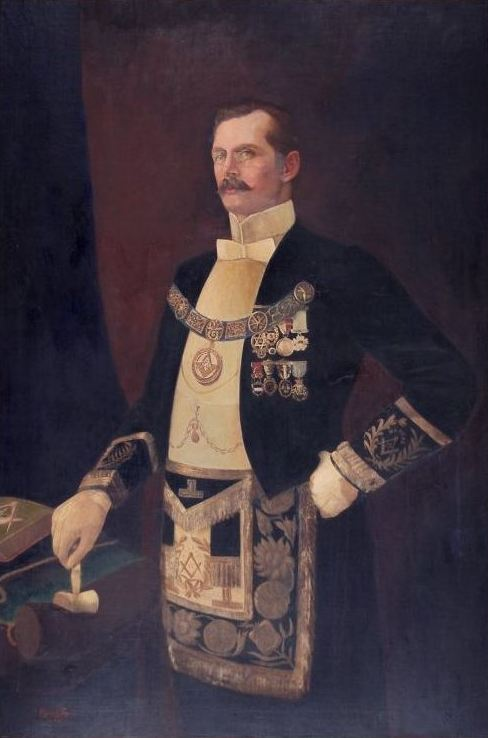
The Lord Ampthill in Masonic regalia by Raja Ravi Varma

Russell was appointed Governor of the Madras Presidency on 5 September 1900, when he was aged 31 years. He served in this position from 1900 to 1906: his tenure was almost contemporaneous with Lord Curzon's Viceregality. As Governor of Madras, Ampthill he inaugurated the King Institute in Madras; the Rangaraya Medical College in Cocanada, on 4 December 1903; and the Cochin State Forest Tramway, the latter on 3 October 1905. During Russell's tenure, sympathy for the Oriya Movement for the creation of a separate province of Orissa increased: Russell opposed the demands for the separation of the Oriya-speaking tracts of Vizagapatam and Ganjam districts from Madras.

=== Viceroy of India ===
When Lord Curzon's tenure came to an end in 1904, Russell was chosen to act as the Viceroy of India until the appointment of a new Viceroy. Russell served from April to December 1904 as Viceroy of India. During his tenure, the proponents of a separate province of Orissa submitted a petition to this effect to Russell. However, Russell rejected all demands to create a separate province of Orissa and include areas from Madras Presidency in it.

As Viceroy, Russell was loyal to Curzon and successfully countered the efforts of St John Brodrick, 1st Earl of Midleton, the Secretary of State for India, who wanted to introduce anti-Curzon policies. However, he was unsuccessful against Lord Kitchener, who tightened his stranglehold over the military department.

He served as the District Grand Master of District Grand Lodge of Madras (1901-1905).

== Later life ==
On returning to England in 1906, Russell took up the cause of Indians in South Africa. He chaired an advisory committee on Indian students in the United Kingdom but disagreed with the Secretary of State for India John Morley on the issue of constitutional reforms. In 1909, Russell wrote an introduction to Joseph Doke's book M. K. Gandhi: an Indian Patriot in South Africa. On 13 July 1909, Lord Ampthill was appointed a Deputy Lieutenant of Bedfordshire.

On his return to England in 1906 he was commissioned as a Major in the 3rd (Bedfordshire Militia) Battalion, Bedfordshire Regiment commanded by his kinsman Herbrand Russell, 11th Duke of Bedford. On 21 June 1908 the militia regiment became part of the Special Reserve and on that day he succeeded the Duke as Lieutenant-Colonel in command. The 3rd (Reserve) Battalion, Bedfordshire Regiment was mobilised under Ampthill's command on the outbreak of World War I and carried out its wartime role of training reinforcements for the Bedfordshire Regiment. Meanwhile, Ampthill commanded the 8th (Service) Battalion, Bedfordshire Regiment, and 13th (Labour) Battalion, Leicestershire Regiment. He was twice mentioned in dispatches and promoted to Brevet Colonel for his war services. He became Honorary Colonel of 3rd Bedfords after the war.

He was one of the co-founders of the National Party in 1917. Lord Ampthill was President of The Magic Circle.

== Death ==
Lord Ampthill died of pneumonia 7 July 1935, a day before Nickalls, prompting the following anonymous epigram among the various tributes in The Times:

Oarsmen they lived, and silver goblets mark
The well-timed prowess of their trusty blades:
In death their rhythm kept, they now embark
To row their long last course among the Shades

== Family ==
On 6 October 1894, Ampthill married Lady Margaret Lygon, the daughter of the 6th Earl Beauchamp in Madresfield, Worcestershire, and they had five children:

- John Russell, 3rd Baron Ampthill (1896–1973)
- Adm Sir Guy Russell (1898–1977)
- Phyllis Margaret Russell, OBE (3 June 1900 – c. 24 May 1998)
- Wg Cdr Edward Wriothesley Curzon Russell, OBE (2 June 1901 – 1982).
- Brig Leopold Oliver Russell, CBE, TD (26 January 1907 – 1988)

He was succeeded in the barony by his eldest son, John Russell.

== Rowing ==
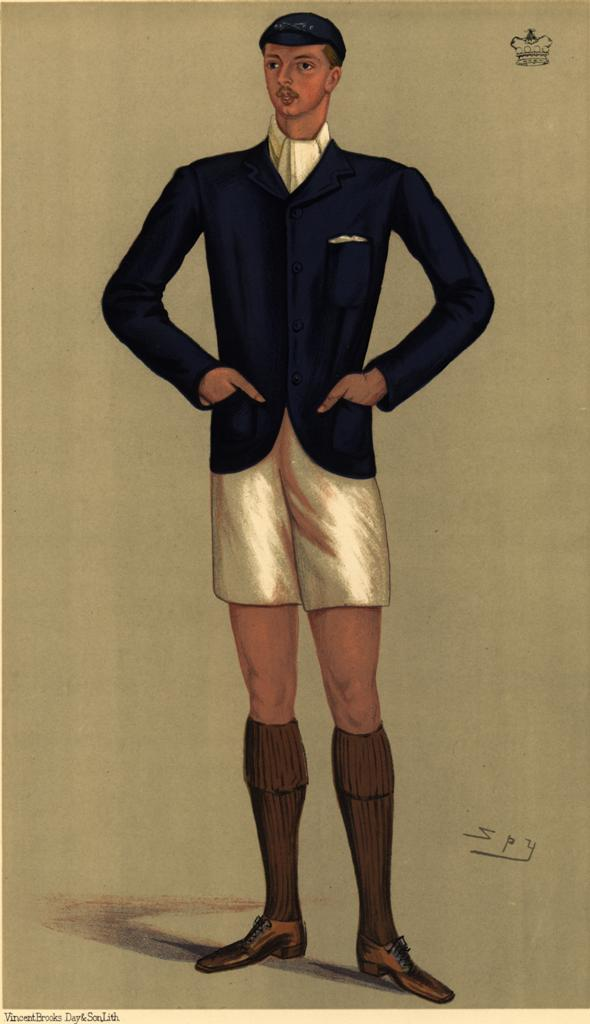
Caricature of Arthur Russell as OUBC president by Spy in Vanity Fair, 1891

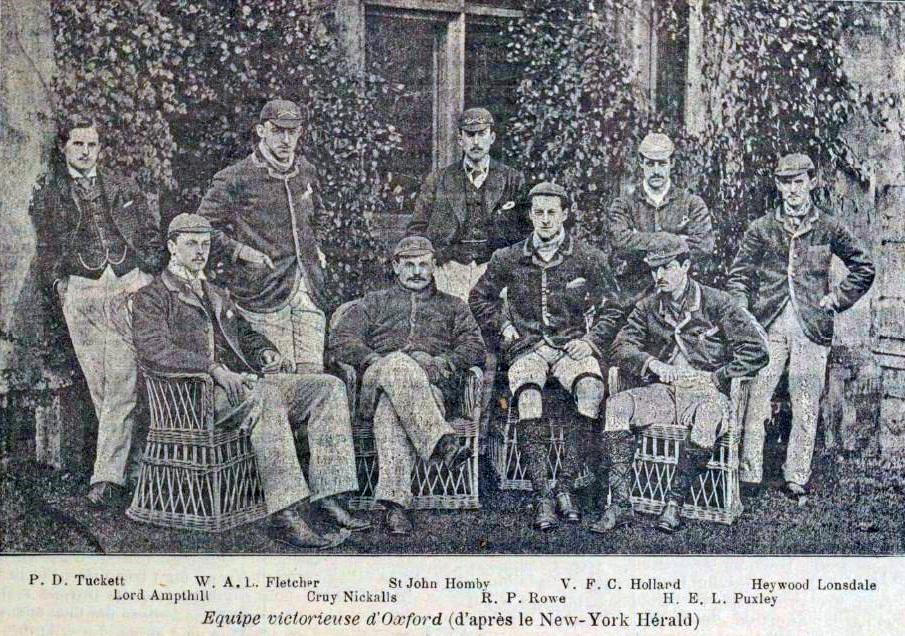
Ampthill with the 1890 Oxford rowing team

Lord Ampthill started rowing at Eton. His record of rowing was one of the longest of his time at Eton and he first had an oar in the Dreadnought on 1 March 1885, going on to be Captain of the Boats in 1887 and 1888.

Whilst at New College, Oxford Ampthill rowed for Oxford three times against Cambridge in the Boat Race (1889 to 1891), winning twice. He was president of both OUBC and the Oxford Union in 1891. After Oxford, he rowed for Leander Club for a short while then moved to London Rowing Club, becoming club president in 1893, a position he remained in for almost 40 years until his death in 1935.

Ampthill raced in the Ladies' Challenge Plate at Henley Royal Regatta for Eton in 1886, 1887 and 1888. In 1889 he raced both the Grand Challenge Cup and the Silver Goblets, losing in the final of the latter by 2-foot to CUBC in a race which the Henley records for the year describe as "One of the best and closest races ever seen". In 1890 he again competed in both events, this time racing under New College colours, and collected his first Henley medal, rowing with Guy Nickalls in the Goblets.

In 1891, racing this time as Leander, Lord Ampthill was in the crew which won the Grand Challenge Cup, setting a new course record. He also repeated his Goblets win, again with Guy Nickalls. Lord Ampthill was elected a Steward of Henley Royal Regatta in 1896, a role he performed until 1900 then again from 1910 until 1927.

=== Henley wins ===
- 1890 – Silver Goblets (rowing as Oxford University Boat Club, with Guy Nickalls)
- 1891 – Grand Challenge Cup (rowing as Leander Club)
- 1891 – Silver Goblets (rowing as Leander Club, with Guy Nickalls)

== International Olympic Committee ==
Between 1894 and 1898, Lord Ampthill was a member of the original International Olympic Committee.

== Freemasonry ==
Ampthill was initiated into Apollo University Lodge No. 357, Oxford, in 1890. He went on to take the chair in several lodges, including Bard of Avon Lodge No. 778, Hampton Court; Royal Alpha Lodge No. 16, London; and Grand Master's Lodge No. 1, London. He was appointed Provincial Grand Master of Bedfordshire in 1900 and as District Grand Master of Madras from 1901 to 1906. He served as Pro Grand Master of United Grand Lodge of England from 1908 until his death in 1935.

Lodge Ampthill No.3682 was consecrated in his name in 1914, and continues to meet in Coimbatore, India, under the District Grand Lodge of Madras of United Grand Lodge of England. Its celebrated its Centenary year in 2014.

== Honours ==
After his appointment as Governor of Madras, Russell was appointed a Knight Grand Commander of the Order of the Indian Empire (GCIE) on 28 December 1900, shortly before his departure for India. He was later appointed a Knight Grand Commander of the Star of India (GCSI) on 2 September 1904.

== See also ==
- List of Oxford University Boat Race crews

Government offices
Preceded by Arthur Havelock	Governor of Madras; 1900–1906	Succeeded by Sir Gabriel Stokes (acting)
Preceded by The Lord Curzon of Kedleston	Viceroy of India, acting 1904	Succeeded by The Lord Curzon of Kedleston
Masonic offices
Preceded by The Earl Amherst	Pro Grand Master of the United Grand Lodge of England; 1908–1935	Succeeded by The Earl of Harewood
Peerage of the United Kingdom
Preceded by Odo Russell	Baron Ampthill; 1884–1935	Succeeded by John Russell
