= Odo Russell, 1st Baron Ampthill =

British diplomat (1829–1884)

The Right Honourable The Lord Ampthill GCB GCMG PC
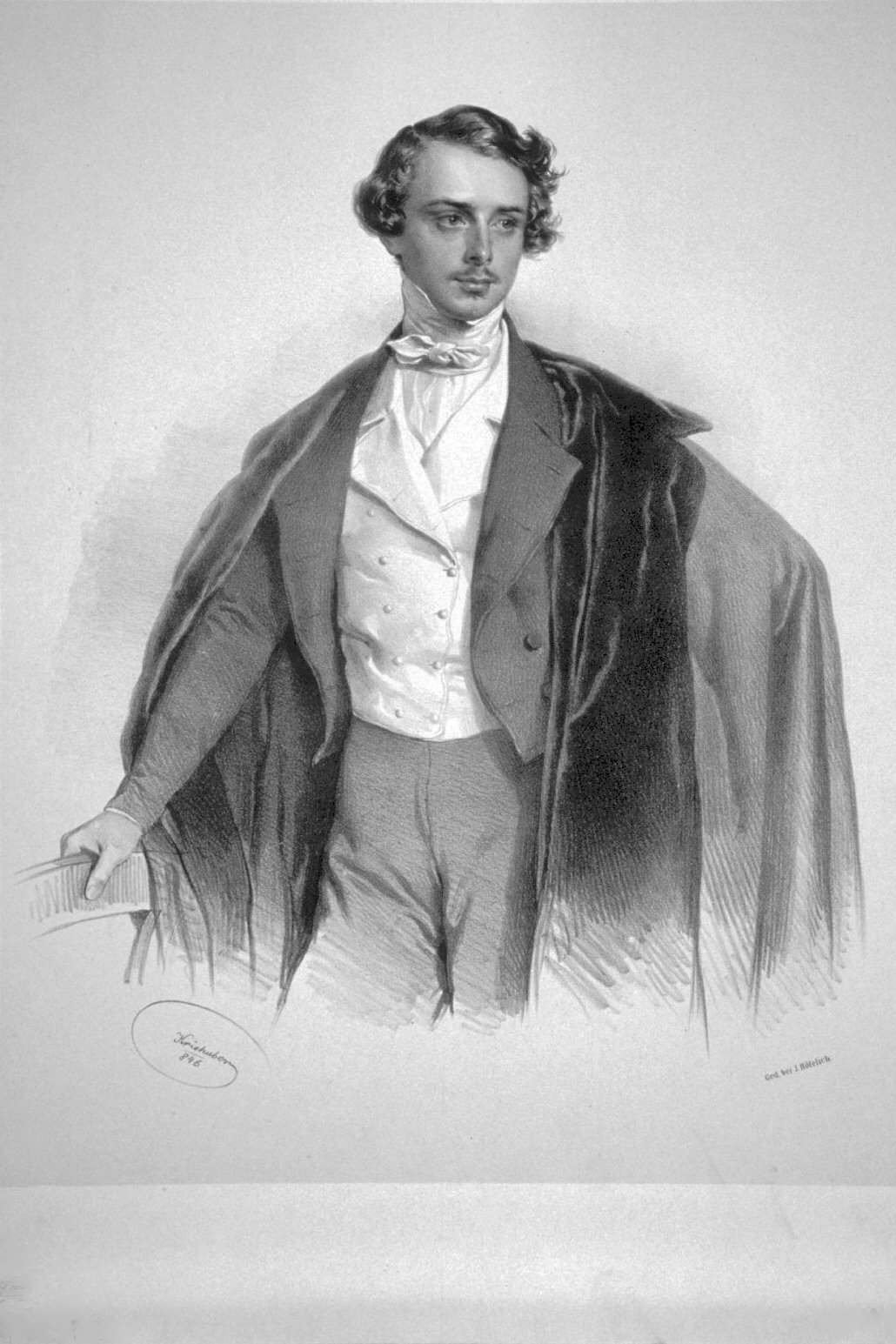
- Lithograph of Russell, by Josef Kriehuber, 1846

British Ambassador to the German Empire
- In office 1871–1884
- Monarch: Victoria
- Preceded by: Lord Augustus Loftus
- Succeeded by: Edward Malet

Personal details
- Born: 20 February 1829 Florence, Tuscany
- Died: 25 August 1884 (aged 55) Potsdam, Germany
- Spouse: Lady Emily Villiers
- Children: 6, including Arthur and Odo
- Parent(s): Lord George Russell; Elizabeth Anne Rawdon

Odo William Leopold Russell, 1st Baron Ampthill, GCB, GCMG, PC (20 February 1829 – 25 August 1884), styled Lord Odo Russell between 1872 and 1881, was a British diplomat and the first British Ambassador to the German Empire.

== Early life ==
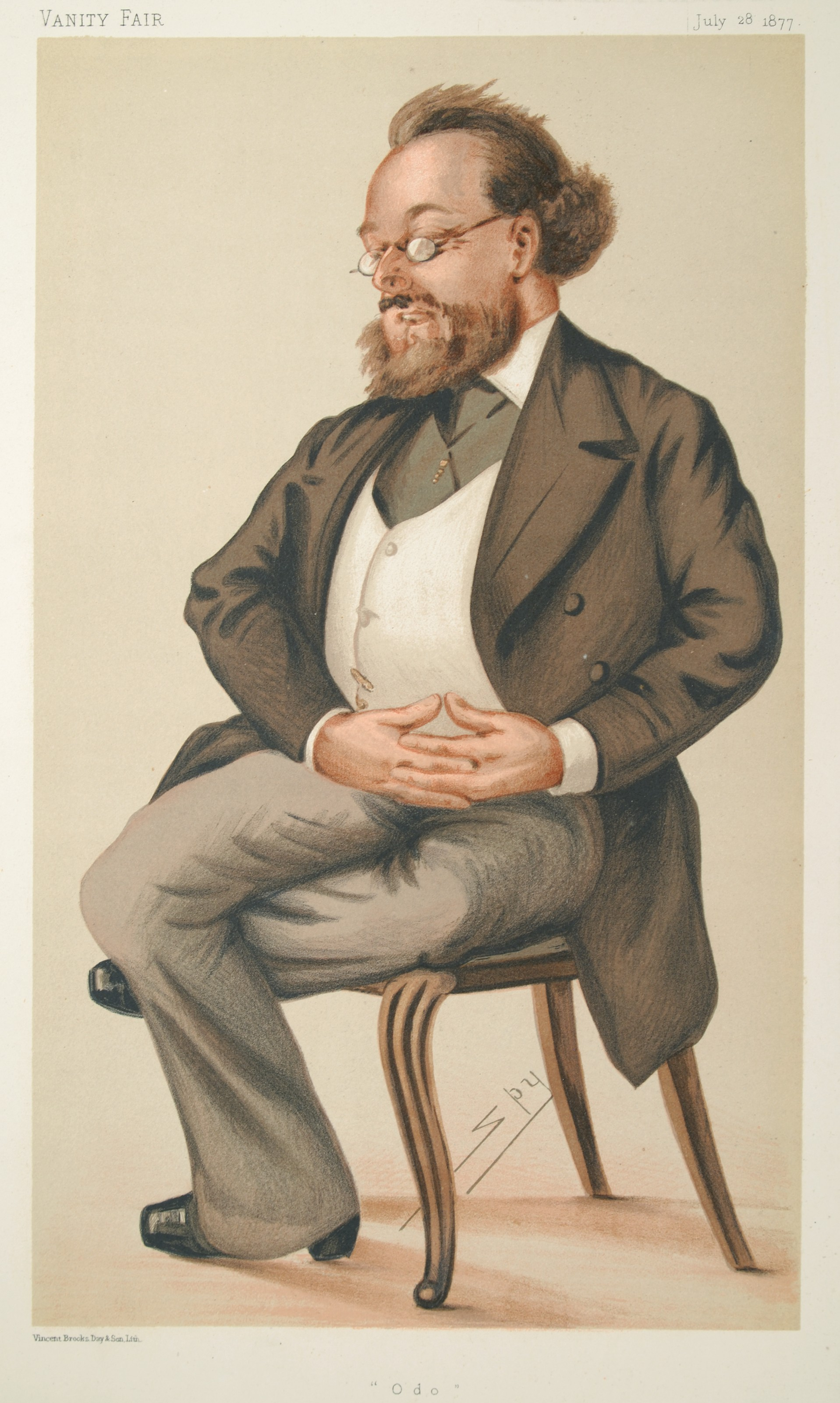
Lord Ampthill, by Leslie Ward, 1877.

Russell was born in Florence, Tuscany, into the Russell family, one of England's leading Whig aristocratic families. His father was Major-General Lord George Russell, second son of the 6th Duke of Bedford. His mother was Elizabeth Anne Rawdon, daughter of John Theophilus Rawdon and niece of the 1st Marquess of Hastings. His uncle was the 1st Earl Russell, twice Prime Minister of the United Kingdom.

His education, like that of his two brothers, Francis and Arthur, was carried on entirely at home, under the general direction of his mother.

== Career ==
In March 1849 Russell was appointed by Lord Malmesbury as attaché at Vienna. From 1850 to 1852 he was temporarily employed in the foreign office, whence he passed to Paris. He remained there, however, only about two months, when he was transferred to Vienna. In 1853 he became second paid attaché at Paris, and in August 1854 he was transferred as first paid attaché to Constantinople, where he served under Lord Stratford de Redcliffe. He had charge of the embassy during his chief's two visits to the Crimea in 1855, but left the East to work under Lord Napier at Washington in 1857. In the following year he became secretary of legation at Florence, but was detached from that place to reside in Rome, where he remained for twelve years, until August 1870. During all that period he was the real though unofficial representative of Britain at the Vatican.

Russell's personal success with Otto von Bismarck led to his appointment as ambassador at Berlin in October 1871. He admired the new Germany and liked Germans: during his thirteen years in Berlin he never forfeited the confidence of Bismarck. Just as he had understood his Constantinople chief, Stratford de Redcliffe, and had never been broken by his suspicious rages, so too he achieved a sympathetic understanding of Bismarck. He withstood the Iron Chancellor's rages about real or imaginary plots, dispelled his darkest suspicions of British policy, and penetrated to the core of Bismarckian motives and strategy. For example, he reported to London in October 1872 how Bismarck's plans for a Kulturkampf were backfiring by strengthening the ultramontane (pro-papal) position inside German Catholicism:

The German Bishops who were politically powerless in Germany and theologically in opposition to the Pope in Rome – have now become powerful political leaders in Germany and enthusiastic defenders of the now infallible Faith of Rome, united, disciplined, and thirsting for martyrdom, thanks to Bismarck's uncalled for antiliberal declaration of War on the freedom they had hitherto peacefully enjoyed.

Russell was trusted by Victoria, the Crown Princess and the Hohenzollerns, but his cordiality to Bismarck's enemies was never tainted by the suspicion of intrigue. Nor was the objectivity of his dispatches compromised by his private belief that Kulturkampf must fail, or by his revulsion at Bismarck's persecution of Roman Catholicism. From the outset, he recognised Germany's colonial aspirations, though his appreciation of this complex situation was imperfect. In 1879 he was responsible for the novelty of attaching a commercial expert to the Berlin embassy staff.

After his eldest brother became eventually 9th Duke of Bedford in 1872, Russell was granted the rank of a younger son of a duke, becoming known as Lord Odo Russell. He was sworn of the Privy Council the same year. He was subsequently made a Knight Grand Cross of the Order of the Bath (GCB) in 1874, a Knight Grand Cross of the Order of St Michael and St George (GCMG) in 1879, and raised to the peerage as Baron Ampthill, of Ampthill in the County of Bedford, in 1881. He was British delegate at the Congress of Berlin in 1878, along with Disraeli, Salisbury and Lord Lyons.

== Personal life ==
On 5 May 1868, Russell was married to Lady Emily Theresa Villiers, daughter of George Villiers, 4th Earl of Clarendon and Lady Katherine Grimston (daughter of the 1st Earl of Verulam). Together, they had six children:

- Arthur Oliver Villiers Russell, later 2nd Baron Ampthill (1869–1935), who married Lady Margaret Lygon, daughter of Frederick Lygon, 6th Earl Beauchamp and Lady Mary Stanhope (daughter of the 5th Earl Stanhope), in 1894.
- Odo William Theopilus Villiers Russell (1870–1951), who married Countess Marie Louise Rex, daughter of Count Rudolf Karl Casper von Rex, in 1910.
- Hon. Constance Evelyn Villiers Russell (1872–1942), who died unmarried.
- Hon. Victor Alexander Frederick Villiers Russell (1874–1965), a barrister who married Annora Margaret Bromley-Martin, daughter of George Edward Bromley-Martin, in 1905.
- Hon. Alexander Victor Frederick Villiers Russell CMG, MVO (1874–1965), who married Marjorie Gladys Guinness, daughter of Claude Hume Campbell Guinness, in 1909.
- Hon. Augusta Louise Margaret Romola Villiers Russell (1879–1966), who died unmarried.

Lord Ampthill died of peritonitis on 25 August 1884, aged 55, at his summer villa at Potsdam, and was interred on 3 September in the 'Bedford Chapel' at St. Michael's Church, Chenies, Buckinghamshire, England. Bismarck thought him irreplaceable. Lady Ampthill died in February 1927, aged 83.

Diplomatic posts
Preceded by Lord Augustus Loftus as Ambassador to the North German Confederation	British Ambassador to the German Empire; 1871–1884	Succeeded by Edward Malet
Peerage of the United Kingdom
New creation	Baron Ampthill; 1881–1884	Succeeded by Oliver Russell
