= Flora Russell =

English noblewoman

- Born: 28 September 1869
- Died: 23 August 1967 (aged 97)
- Parent(s): Arthur Russell; Laura Peyronnet

Flora Magdalen Isabel Russell (28 September 1869 – 23 August 1967) was an English noblewoman, childhood friend of Gertrude Bell.

== Biography ==
Flora Magdalen Isabel Russell was born on 28 September 1869, the daughter of Lord Arthur Russell and Lady Laura de Peyronnet, daughter of Paul Louis Jules, Vicomte de Peyronnet. Her siblings were: Harold Russell; Sir Claud Russell; Caroline Diana Rosalind Russell; Maj Gilbert Russell; and Conrad Russell. She was the niece of the 9th Duke of Bedford. Harold John Hastings Russell's daughter, Elizabeth Russell married Richard Plunket Greene and their son, Alexander Plunket Greene, who married Mary Quant, was Flora Russell's favourite grandnephew.

The Russells at the time of Flora's youth were the envy of London. They lived at 2 Audley Square, Mayfair, and their house were frequented by well-known figures like Leslie Stephen and his daughters, Virginia and Vanessa; Mary Ward; Henry James and John Sargent; Vera Brittain.

She was briefly engaged to George Stephen, older stepbrother of Virginia Woolf. Hearing the news, Woolf sent a congratulations telegram: "She is an angel" and signed with her family nickname "Goat". The telegram delivered was "She is an aged Goat." George Stephen later commented that he thought Woolf was referring to Flora Russell's reluctance to ally herself with the Stephen family. Woolf denied and said the mistake was due to her handwriting. At the end George Stephen married Lady Margaret Herbert.

She was a watercolour painter and her portrait of Gertrude Bell, traveller, spy and archaeologist, is at the National Portrait Gallery. Bell was a childhood friend and Russell and Bell, together with Russell's sister, Diana, worked together at the Wounded & Missing Enquiry Department (W&MED) office in France. The W&MED, founded by Lord Robert Cecil, was offering tracking services for the men involved in the World War I: killed soldiers whose name wasn't yet official; wounded soldiers in hospital unable to communicate with home; and prisoners. Flora and Diana would take turns so that at least one of them was always in the office.

Having many relatives in the diplomatic corps around the world, while she was travelling she was a guest of the British embassies instead of lodging at hotels.

In 1921, Flora Russell sold for £22,500 (£1,260,856 in 2023 sterling) the townhouse at 2 Audley Square she had inherited from her father to the University Women's Club, which is still housed there. In 1928, she moved to the country, and built "South Down". The house was later bought by her great-nephew, Alexander Plunket Greene, the husband of Mary Quant.

In 1965, Gimson and Eustace recorded Flora Russell, at the time 96 years old, whose speech they regard as a "good example of a certain kind of Victorian English".

Flora Russell died on 23 August 1967, Diana Russell on 31 October 1971, both sisters at 97 years old, unmarried.

== Ancestry ==
Ancestors of Flora Russell

John Russell
George Russell
Georgiana Byng
Arthur Russell
John Rawdon
Elizabeth Rawdon
Frances Hall-Stevenson
Flora Russell
Paul Peyronnet
Laura Peyronnet
George Whitfield
Georgina Whitfield
Georgiana Ross
