= Gilbert Byng Alwyne Russell =

British military officer and banker

Gilbert Russell
- Born: 1 June 1875
- Died: 5 May 1942 (aged 66)
- Allegiance: British Empire
- Service years: 1897-1900
- Conflicts: Boxer Rebellion; Battle of Omdurman; Battle of Biddulphsberg
- Spouse: Maud Julia Augusta Russell (m. 1917)
- Children: Martin and Raymond

Gilbert Byng Alwyne Russell (1 June 1875 – 28 May 1942) was a British military officer and banker, who made his home at Mottisfont.

== Background ==
Russell was the son of Lord Arthur Russell and Laura de Peyronnet, daughter of Paul Louis Jules, Viscount of Peyronnet. His cousin was the Duke of Bedford. His siblings included Harold Russell, Flora Russell, Claud Russell, Caroline Russell, and Conrad Russell.

== Military career ==
Russell joined the Grenadier Guards as a second lieutenant on 1 December 1897, and was promoted to lieutenant on 20 April 1899. He served in the Mahdist War (1898), and was present at the Battle of Omdurman, for which he received the Queen's Sudan Medal and the Khedive's Sudan Medal (1897). In early 1900, he joined his regiment in South Africa during the Second Boer War, and took part in operations in the Orange Free State from April to May 1900, followed by the Battle of Biddulphsberg and Wittebergen (July 1900). After the end of hostilities in May 1902, he left Cape Town the following month on board the SS City of Vienna, arriving at Southampton in late July. Rising to the rank of Major, Russell's military career also included World War 1.

== Banking ==
In 1917, Russell married Maud Nelke, daughter of Paul Nelke, a German Jew who was the senior partner in Nelke, Phillips & Bendix. Her grandfather had been Master of the Mint in Frankfurt and Berlin. After a stint with Salomon Brothers, Russell's father-in-law assisted him with setting up the merchant banking firm, Cull and Company.

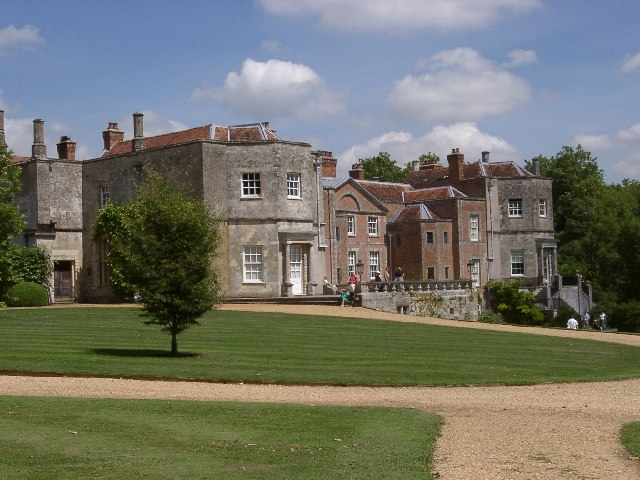
Mottisfont

Russell and his wife had lived in Prince's Gate, South Kensington, London, as well as Heveningham Hall (Suffolk) and Stanway House (Gloucestershire). In 1934, he purchased Mottisfont. There were two sons from the marriage, Martin Basil Paul Russell (born 1918) and Raymond Anthony Russell.

After Russell's death, his wife made arrangements for Mottisfont and its 2,080 acres (840 ha) estate to be preserved with the National Trust.

== Ancestry ==
Ancestors of Gilbert Byng Alwyne Russell

John Russell
George Russell
Georgiana Byng
Arthur Russell
John Rawdon
Elizabeth Rawdon
Frances Hall-Stevenson
Gilbert Russell
Paul Peyronnet
Laura Peyronnet
George Whitfield
Georgina Whitfield
Georgiana Ross
