= Hugo Dixon =

British business journalist (born 1963)

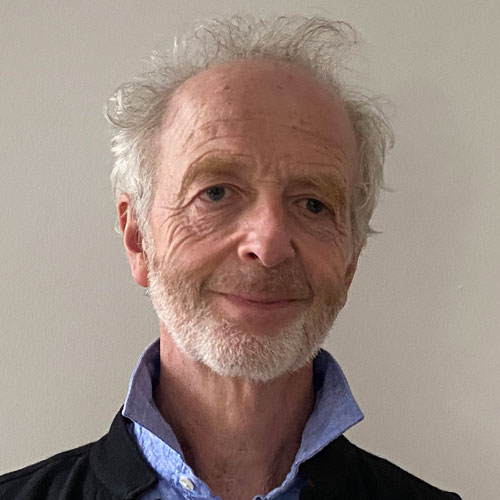
- Born: Hugo Duncan Dixon; December 1963 (age 62)
- Citizenship: United Kingdom; Greece
- Education: Oxford University; Balliol College, Oxford
- Occupations: Journalist and campaigner
- Known for: The Russian Transfer; Ukraine Reparations Loan; People's Vote; Grexit; Co-founder, editor-in-chief and chairman Breakingviews; Former editor of the Financial Times Lex Column
- Parents: Piers Dixon (father); Edwina Sandys (mother)
- Relatives: Winston Churchill (great-grandfather); Laura Sandys (aunt)
- Awards: 2000 Business Journalist of the Year, British Press Awards; 2008 Decade of Excellence Award, Business Journalist of the Year Awards
- Website: The Russian Transfer

Hugo Duncan Dixon (born December 1963) is a campaigner and columnist. He is commentator-at-large for Reuters. He is also a principal architect of a plan for the European Union to take custody of Russia’s immobilised sovereign accounts. He has dual British and Greek citizenship.

Dixon was prominent in the campaign to stop Brexit as editor-in-chief of InFacts and one of the founders and leaders of the People’s Vote campaign. He was also one of the initiators of the Group of Seven’s partnership for global infrastructure and investment, a $600 billion plan to help the Global South accelerate its transition to net zero.

Dixon was previously editor-in-chief and chairman of the financial commentary website Breakingviews which he co-founded. During that period, he played an influential role in the Greek financial crisis, arguing strongly against the country’s withdrawal from the eurozone. Before that, he was the editor of the Financial Times Lex column.

He is of Greek descent through his paternal grandmother, who was from Samarina, and in 2025 he acquired Greek citizenship.

== Early life ==
Hugo Duncan Dixon was born in December 1963 to the Conservative MP Piers Dixon and the artist Edwina Sandys. The couple divorced in 1970 when Dixon was six. Dixon has an older brother, Mark Pierson Dixon, born in 1962.

== Education ==
Dixon was a King's Scholar at Eton and gained a first in Philosophy, Politics and Economics (PPE) at Balliol College, Oxford. He has an MPhil (Stud) in philosophy from Birkbeck College, London. The title of his thesis was To what extent is a meaningful life an integrated one?

== Journalism ==
=== Financial Times and The Economist ===
Dixon joined the Financial Times (FT) in 1986 after a year at The Economist. He was in succession a junior banking correspondent, telecoms and electronics correspondent, and a leader writer. In 1994 he became editor of the paper's Lex column., which he ran until 1999.

=== Breakingviews and Reuters ===
Inspired by an interview with Bill Gates in 1999, Dixon quit his job at the FT and co-founded – with his colleague from the FT, Jonathan Ford – Breakingviews, a website providing financial commentary. Dixon was chair and editor-in-chief. In addition to its website, Breakingviews published regular columns often for years at a time in newspapers such as The Wall Street Journal, The New York Times, La Repubblica and Le Monde. In 2007, Dixon and Ford fell out and Ford left to help set up a rival financial commentary website at Reuters.

In 2009, Dixon sold Breakingviews to Reuters for £13 million, making himself £2.5 million, with a retention bonus for Dixon to stay on as the website's editor for the following three years. The move meant that Ford lost his position at Reuters. Dixon continued as Breakingviews editor until 2012. After that he became Reuters' editor-at-large, writing a weekly column both for Reuters and the New York Times. He took a break from writing regular columns to focus on his pro-EU activism. But he returned to writing a new column on geopolitics and geoeconomics as Reuters’ commentator-at-large in 2022.

=== Greek financial crisis ===
Dixon had an influential role in the Greek financial crisis, arguing against Grexit. He wrote multiple columns which were often published simultaneously in Reuters, The New York Times, Kathimerini and Breakingviews. He had prominent clashes in the media with Yanis Varoufakis, at one point Greek finance minister, whom Dixon argued was driving the country close to bankruptcy and exit from the eurozone. He was later awarded Greece’s Gold Cross of the Order of the Phoenix.

== Campaigning ==
=== SDP (1987-1988) ===
In 1987, Dixon took a break from the FT to work for the then Social Democratic Party (SDP) leader Bob Maclennan to write the manifesto for the party's merger with the Liberals. Voices and Choices For All became known as 'the dead parrot document' after the famous Monty Python sketch because, when Liberal MPs read about its proposals in this paper, they barricaded their leader David Steel into his Commons office and told him he would be turfed out if he backed the controversial document – copies of which had already been left for journalists waiting at the press conference to announce the merger.

=== Pro-EU activism (2014-2019) ===
Dixon is pro-EU and opposed to Brexit. He was the chair and editor-in-chief of InFacts, a website that focused on making the fact-based case against Brexit, both in the run-up to the 2016 referendum and after.

Dixon was also one of the founders of the People's Vote Campaign which campaigned for a new referendum on Brexit once the terms of the exit deal were known. He spoke at the campaign's launch. Dixon wrote a book opposing Brexit and multiple pro-EU articles for publications such as The Guardian and The Independent.

=== Climate change ===
Dixon was the author of the unpublished Clean and Green Initiative in March 2021, a paper urging the Group of Seven rich democracies to help developing and emerging countries decarbonise rapidly. Boris Johnson, then UK prime minister, adopted the plan and worked with Joe Biden, then US president, to turn it into a G7 initiative. This was launched at the G7 summit in Carbis Bay, UK in 2021 under the name of Build Back Better for the World. It was then rebranded the Partnership for Global Infrastructure and Investment with the aim of channelling $600 billion to developing countries by 2027.

=== Frozen Russian sovereign assets ===
Dixon is a principal architect of a plan, called the Russian Transfer, for the European Union to take custody of Russia’s immobilised sovereign accounts – and a previous idea to channel the assets to Ukraine via a reparations loan.

Dixon devised the reparations loan plan in March 2024 with Lee Buchheit, the sovereign debt lawyer, and Daleep Singh, the economist. The key principle was to use the $300 billion immobilised funds, of which €210 billion are in the EU, as a downpayment against Russia’s obligation under international law to pay reparations. They proposed it as a legally solid alternative to confiscating Russia’s assets – and so likely to be more politically acceptable. Dixon and Buchheit published a simpler variation of their reparations loan proposal with Nathalie Loiseau, the French MEP, in July 2025.

Ursula von der Leyen, the president of the European Commission, backed the idea in her state of the union speech in 2025. The Commission came up with its own version of the reparations loan, which was slightly different from the one that Dixon and his colleagues had proposed. They had suggested transferring the entire Russian account with its liabilities out of Belgium, where the main account was held. The Commission instead proposed borrowing the cash from Belgium’s Euroclear but leaving it with the liability to the Central Bank of Russia. The Commission failed to get approval for its plan at the December 2025 European Council after Belgium and other countries objected.

Dixon and his colleagues then switched their attention to persuading the EU to transfer the entire Russian account out of Belgium. They have proposed that the EU creates a new instrument which would take custody of all the immobilised Russian sovereign accounts in bloc and provide protection to those companies that do this as well as their governments. Hugo Dixon published an article with Annegret Kramp-Karrenbauer, chair of the Konrad Adenauer Foundation, proposing this in March 2026.

== Bibliography ==
- Dixon, Hugo (2000). The Penguin guide to finance. London: Penguin. ISBN 9780140289329.
- Dixon, Hugo (2002). Finance just in time: understanding the key to business and investment before it's too late. New York London: Texere Publishing. ISBN 9781587991493.
- Dixon, Hugo (2014). The in/out question: why Britain should stay in the EU and fight to make it better. California: Scampstonian. ISBN 9781496146670.

== Awards ==
- 2000 British Press Awards, Business Journalist of the Year (Financial Times)
- 2008 Business Journalist of the Year Awards, Decade of Excellence Award (breakingviews)
- Gold Cross of the Order of the Phoenix, Greece

== Ancestry ==
Ancestors of Hugo Dixon

8. Pierson John Dixon (1868–1934)
4. Pierson Dixon
9. Helen Barbara (Nellie) Beales
2. Piers Dixon
10. Shirley Clifford Atchley
5. Alexandra Ismene Atchley
11. Anastasia Zersi Gerasi
1. Hugo Dixon
12. George Sandys (div. 1921)
6. Duncan Sandys, Baron Duncan-Sandys
13. Mildred Helen Cameron (div. 1921)
3. Hon. Edwina Sandys
14. Sir Winston Spencer Churchill
7. Diana Churchill
15. Clementine Spencer-Churchill, Baroness Spencer-Churchill
