= Lord Arthur Russell =

British Liberal Party politician

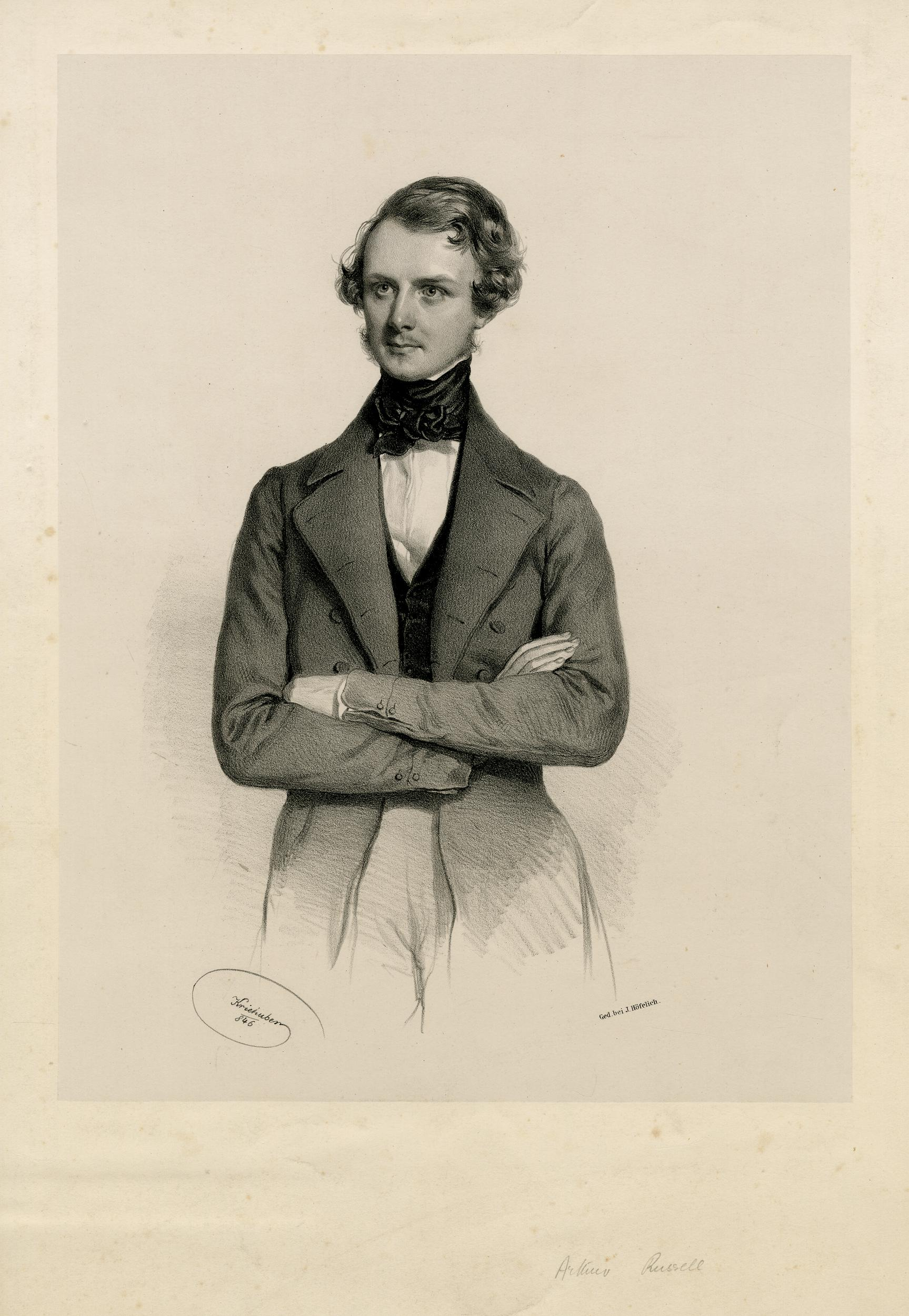
- Portrait of Russell, by Joseph Kriehuber, c. 1846-1856

Member of Parliament for Tavistock
- In office 1857–1885 Serving with George Byng, Joseph d'Aguilar Samuda
- Preceded by: George Byng; Sir John Salusbury-Trelawny, Bt
- Succeeded by: Viscount Ebrington

Personal details
- Born: Arthur John Edward Russell; 13 June 1825 London, England
- Died: 4 April 1892 (aged 66) Audley Square, London
- Party: Liberal
- Spouse: Laura de Peyronnet (after 1865)
- Relations: Francis Russell, 9th Duke of Bedford (brother); Odo Russell, 1st Baron Ampthill (brother); John Russell, 1st Earl Russell (uncle)
- Children: 6, including Gilbert
- Parent(s): Lord George William Russell; Elizabeth Anne Rawdon

Lord Arthur John Edward Russell (13 June 1825 – 4 April 1892) was a British Liberal Party politician.

== Early life ==
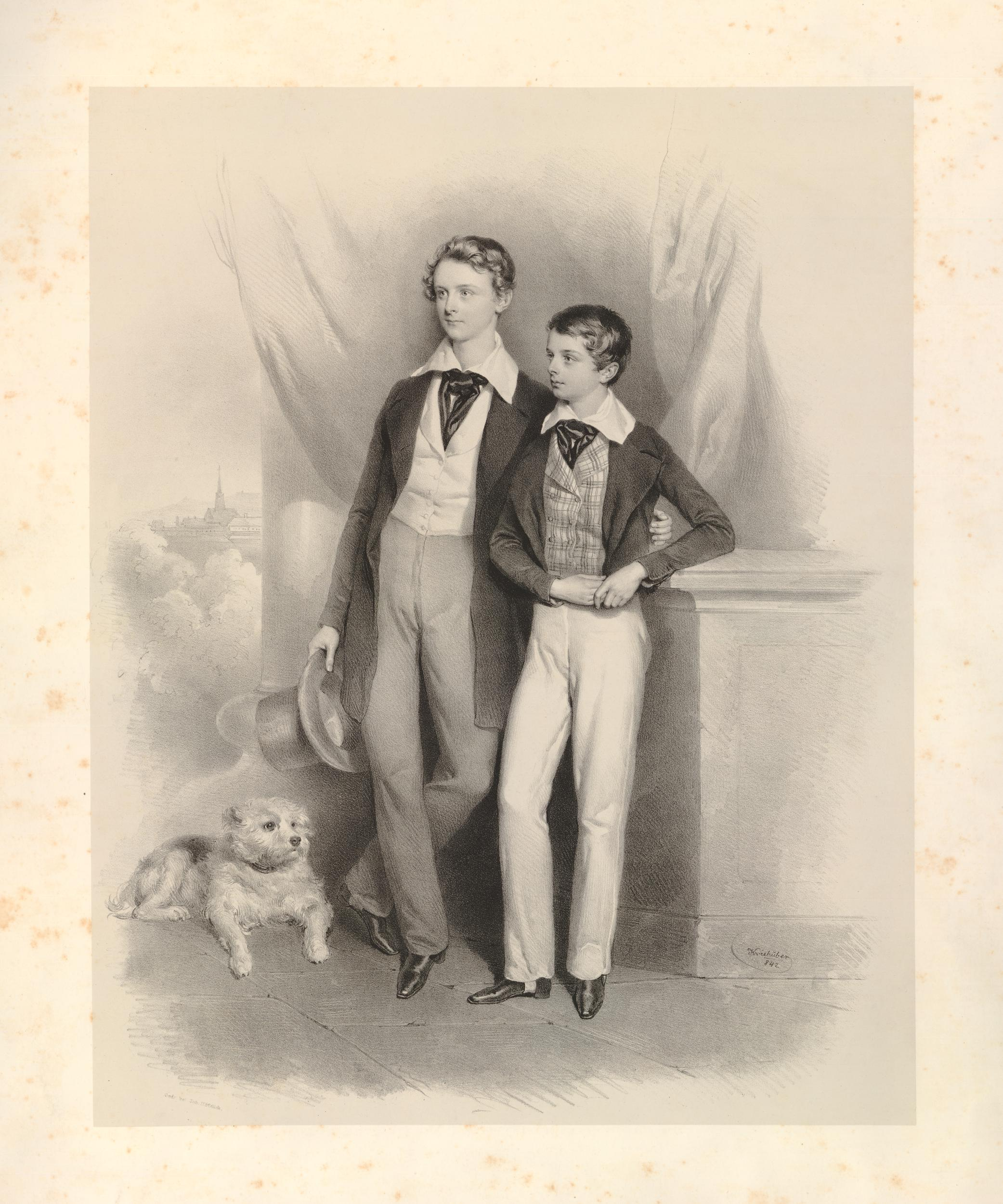
Portrait of Russell and his younger brother Odo, by Joseph Kriehuber, c. 1846-1856

He was born in London on 13 June 1825. He was the second of three sons of Major-General Lord George William Russell and Elizabeth Anne Rawdon. His elder brother was Francis Russell, 9th Duke of Bedford and his younger brother was Odo Russell, 1st Baron Ampthill, the first British Ambassador to the German Empire. His sister was Blanche Russell.

His father was the second son of the John Russell, 6th Duke of Bedford by his first wife, Hon. Georgiana Byng (a daughter of George Byng, 4th Viscount Torrington). His maternal grandparents were Frances (née Hall-Stevenson) and the Hon. John Theophilus Rawdon (himself second son of the 1st Earl of Moira).

== Career ==
Like his brothers, he was educated abroad by private tutors, primarily in Germany. From 1849 to 1854 he was private Secretary to his uncle, the Liberal Prime Minister Lord John Russell. Between 1857 and 1885, he sat as Member of Parliament (MP) for Tavistock. He was said to have only spoke rarely in the Commons, once in reply to an attack on his brother, Odo.

He belonged to Brooks's, the Athenaeum, the Cosmopolitan, Grillion's, THE CLUB, and the Metaphysical Society. He was involved in the Senate of the University of London, serving on this body from 1875 until before his death.

The ideological gulf between Britain and the new German Empire was stressed by Lord Arthur Russell in 1872: "Prussia now represents all that is most antagonistic to the liberal and democratic ideas of the age; military despotism, the rule of the sword, contempt for sentimental talk, indifference to human suffering, imprisonment of independent opinion, transfer by force of unwilling populations to a hateful yoke, disregard of European opinion, total want of greatness and generosity, etc., etc."

== Personal life ==
On 25 September 1865, Russell married Laura de Peyronnet, the eldest of three daughters of Paul Louis Jules, Vicomte de Peyronnet, and his English wife, Georgina Frances Whitfield. Laura, who was also sister to Isabelle, Marchioness of Sligo (wife of the 3rd Marquess of Sligo), was an amateur portraitist. He was raised to the rank of a Duke's son on 25 June 1872 and was then known as Lord Arthur Russell. Together they had six children, including:

- Harold John Hastings Russell (1868–1926), a barrister who married Lady Victoria Alberta Leveson-Gower, daughter of Granville Leveson-Gower, 2nd Earl Granville, in 1896.
- Flora Magdalen Isabel Russell (1869–1967), a watercolour painter who died unmarried.
- Sir Claud Frederick William Russell (1871–1959), a diplomat who married Athenais Atchley, daughter of Shirley Clifford Atchley, in 1920.
- Caroline Diana Rosalind Russell (1874–1971), who died unmarried.
- Gilbert Byng Alwyne Russell (1875–1942), a Major in the Bedfordshire Yeomanry who married Maud Nelke, daughter of Paul Nelke, in 1917.
- Conrad George Edward Russell (1878–1947), a writer who died unmarried.

After an illness of several weeks, Russell died on 4 April 1892, at 2 Audley Square, London and was buried in Brompton Cemetery, London. There is a memorial to him in the 'Bedford Chapel' at St. Michael's Church, Chenies. His widow and nephew, the Duke of Bedford, served as executors of his will.

Parliament of the United Kingdom
Preceded by George Byng; Sir John Salusbury-Trelawny, 9th Bt	Member of Parliament for Tavistock; 1857 – 1885; With: George Byng 1857–1868; Joseph d'Aguilar Samuda 1865–1868	Succeeded by Viscount Ebrington
