= Business Journalist of the Year Awards =

- Description: Recognition for business and finance journalists and broadcasters
- Location: London (Primary ceremony location)
- Presented by: World Business Forum / Associated Sponsors
- Website: www.businessjournalist.com

The Business Journalist of the Year Awards recognize business and finance journalists and broadcasters from around the world. They were first presented in 1999.

== History ==
The Awards were created by The Leadership Forum, (previously the World Leadership Forum Ltd.) which has now ceased operation. With business information now a global commodity, the objective of the awards was to maintain the quality of information being reported.

The Awards are judged exclusively by journalists, and governed by the World's leading business editors. In 2007, the Editors' Committee composed of Martin Dickson, Deputy Editor of the Financial Times; Robert Peston, business editor at the BBC; Hugo Dixon, editor-in-chief and chairman of Breakingviews; Jesse Lewis, managing editor of The Wall Street Journal Europe; and Rik Kirkland, former managing editor of Fortune.
