= John Sparrow (executive) =

English businessman (1933–2020)

John Sparrow

Sir John Sparrow, FCA (4 June 1933 – 21 March 2020) was an English businessman, chartered accountant and government adviser.

Educated at the Stationers' Company's School he went on to London School of Economics (LSE), he worked in the accountancy firm Rawlinson and Hunter from 1954 to 1959, before spells with Ford, AEI-Hotpoint and United Leasing Corporation in the early 1960s. From 1964 to 1988, he worked for the Morgan Grenfell Group, as a director from 1971; he was also chairman of Morgan Grenfell Asset Management from 1985 to 1988. Alongside directorships in other companies, he was chairman of the Universities Superannuation Scheme from 1988 to 1996, the National Stud from 1988 to 1991 and the Horserace Betting Levy Board from 1991 to 1999.

From 1982 to 1983, Sparrow was seconded as Director-General of the Central Policy Review Staff, a government advisory body based in the Cabinet Office. He was knighted for his service 1984. He was also a governor of LSE from 1984 to 2003 (serving as vice-chairman until 1993) and was made an honorary LSE fellow in 1994, and also held an honorary fellowship at Wolfson College, Cambridge, from 1987.

Government offices
Preceded by Sir Robin Ibbs	Director-General of the Central Policy Review Staff; 1982–1983	Succeeded by none
