= Hermann Marx =

British banker

- Born: c. 1881; Elberfeld, German Empire
- Died: 24 August 1947 (aged 65–66); Ockley, Surrey, England
- Occupations: Stockbroker and banker
- Known for: Co-founder, Cull and Company; Book collection
- Board member of: Nelke, Philips & Company; Cull and Company

Hermann Marx (c.1881 – 24 August 1947) was a German-born British stockbroker, banker, and a noted print and book collector.

Marx was born in Germany but emigrated to Britain and became a naturalised British citizen in 1906. He worked first as a stockbroker's clerk for Nelke, Philips & Company before becoming a partner there at age 26. In 1921 he was one of four who formed the merchant bank Cull and Company with the support of Paul Nelke. The firm boasted many wealthy clients in the natural resources sector such as Chester Beatty and Calouste Gulbenkian.

Marx had a reputation for expertise in structuring deals such as the fundraising by James and Shakespeare in 1934 which was part of a failed plan by others to corner the world market in white pepper. The scheme resulted in its promoters being jailed for publishing a false prospectus in what became known as the "pepper scandal".

A noted book and print collector, Marx owned a 1497 edition of Ovid's Metamorphoses printed by Lucantonio Giunti and a manuscript copy of Pietro de' Crescenzi's Liber Ruralium Commodorum ("book of rural benefits"). After his death, his library and print collection were divided between the British Museum and sales at auction by Sotheby's. He left an estate valued at £1,262,492 in 1947, equivalent to £42,710,000 in 2025.

== Early life and family ==
Hermann Marx was born in Elberfeld, Germany, around 1881, into a Jewish family. He emigrated to the United Kingdom and became a naturalised British citizen in 1906. He married Lisbet, who was born in Germany, and had children Paul (deceased in WW2), Erica, Ursula, and Robin.

== Career ==
Marx joined the stockbrokers Nelke, Philips & Company at the age of 18 as a clerk. By the age of 26 he was a partner in the firm. The firm suffered difficulties during the First World War because of the German origin of some of its partners and its head Paul Nelke was not re-elected to membership of the London Stock Exchange. The firm was dissolved in 1917 and Nelke formed a merchant banking firm of the same name but in 1921 that too was closed with the winding-up handled by Cull and Company, of which Marx was a director.

Cull had been founded in 1921 by Nelke's son-in-law Gilbert Russell, with Hugh Micklem, Anders Cull, and Hermann Marx. All were former oil jobbers apart from Marx who brought financial creativity to the firm and was the only Jew. Based in Throgmorton Avenue, the firm's major clients included mining magnate and bibliophile Chester Beatty and his company Selection Trust, chemical company British Celanese, textile firm Courtaulds, and businesses with interests in Venezuelan oil. Cull floated Ultramar on the stock exchange and did business with petroleum magnate and art collector Calouste Gulbenkian. James Bond author Ian Fleming worked there from 1933 to 1935.

Marx had a reputation for shrewdness and expertise in structuring financial deals. In 1934, he was the partner at Cull responsible for structuring the issue of preference shares in the commodity brokers James and Shakespeare, which Cull also underwrote. James and Shakespeare soon afterwards went bankrupt in what became known as the "pepper scandal" when it was revealed that the firm had built up huge debts as part of a failed attempt by John Howeson and Garabed Bishirgian to corner the market in white pepper. Both men and one other were jailed in 1936 for publishing a false prospectus which made no mention of the word "pepper". Many Mincing Lane commodity brokers in London, who had lent the firm money, were threatened with bankruptcy and only saved after the governor of the Bank of England ordered a bail-out of the affected firms in order to avoid wider financial contagion.

Cull and Company was acquired by Morgan Grenfell and Company in 1943.

== Collecting ==
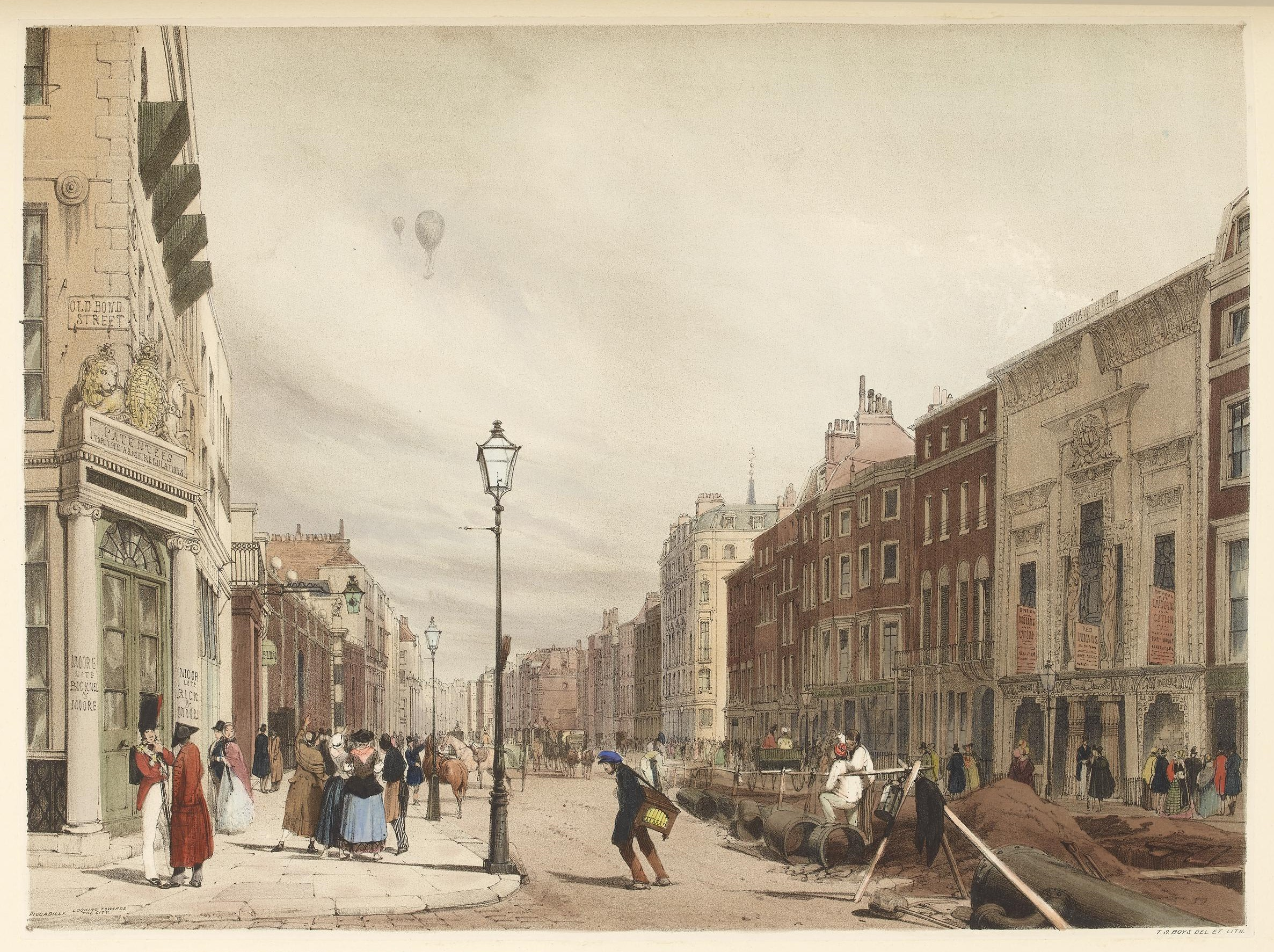
Piccadilly looking towards the City, an 1842 lithograph donated to the British Museum by Marx.

Marx was a noted bibliophile and print collector. Among the important works in his collection was a 1497 edition of Ovid's Metamorphoses printed by Lucantonio Giunti, formerly in the Dyson Perrins collection. The book has been described as "one of the most significant illustrated books produced in Venice during this period." He also owned a manuscript copy of Pietro de' Crescenzi's Liber Ruralium Commodorum ("book of rural benefits"), formerly in the ownership of Robert Hoe and Chester Beatty. The work was written in the early 1300s and circulated first in manuscript form, and was not printed until 1471.

On his death, Marx left the 13 volumes of his extra-illustrated edition of Thomas Pennant's Description of London to the British Museum as well as a large number of other items. Part of his "very choice and valuable library" was sold at auction by Sotheby's in April 1948, while his prints were sold by the same firm in May 1948.

In 2022, it was reported that jade and ivory items worth more than £1.9m formerly belonging to Fay Marx (died 2021) had been stolen from her by her gardener and others over a period of years and sold at auction by Bonhams. Fay had received the items from her first husband Robin Marx, who had likely obtained them from his father, Hermann Marx.

== Death and legacy ==
Marx died at Farm Place, Ockley, Surrey, on 24 August 1947. His residence at the time of his death was Fairmile Lea, Cobham, Surrey. He left an estate valued at £1,262,492 (equivalent to £42,709,941 in 2025) which included Farm Place at over 290 acres (120 ha). He received an obituary in the Evening Standard titled "Mr Marx leaves a million: Few guessed his wealth" which centred on his quiet and retiring nature. The paper commented that his name was rarely heard in financial circles and his activities known only to a few close friends, yet "he died one of the richest men in England". His true loves, however, were art and rare books.
