= Mark Mobius =

German businessman (1936–2026)

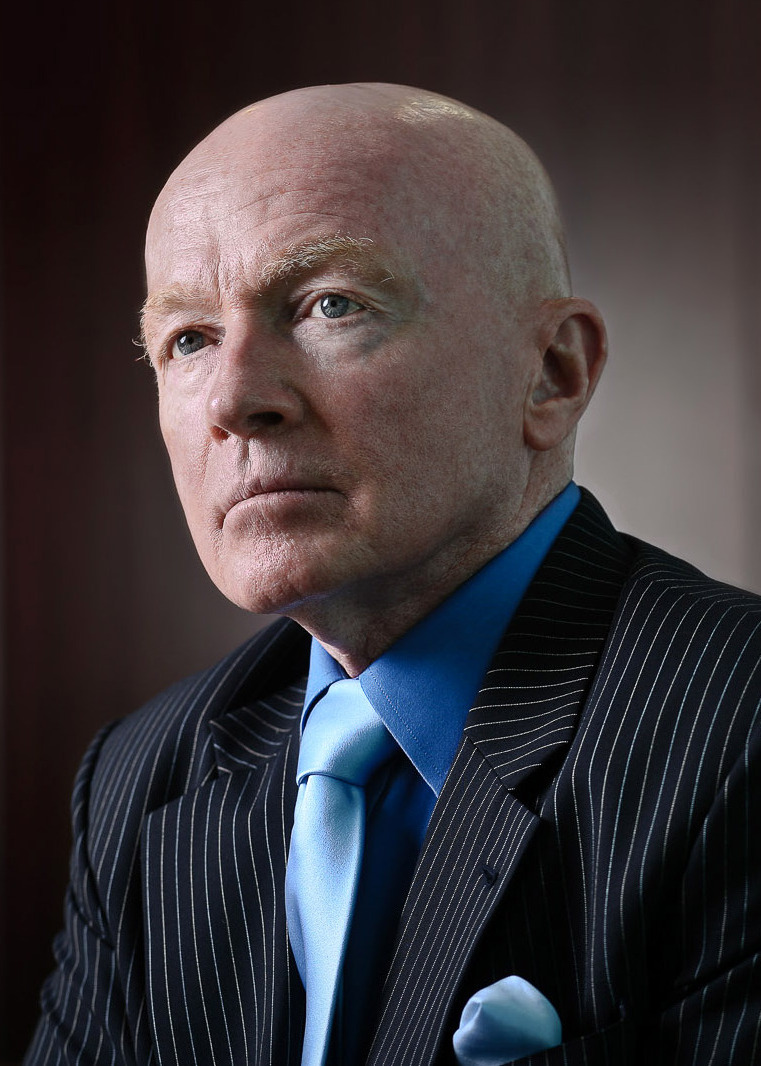
- Mobius in 2008
- Born: Joseph Bernhard Mark Mobius; 17 August 1936; New York, U.S.
- Died: 15 April 2026 (aged 89); Singapore
- Citizenship: United States (renounced); Germany
- Education: Boston University (BA, MS); Massachusetts Institute of Technology (PhD)
- Occupations: Consulting, investing, money managing

Joseph Bernhard Mark Mobius (17 August 1936 – 15 April 2026) was a German emerging markets fund manager and founder of Mobius Capital Partners LLP. He was previously employed at Franklin Templeton where he ran the Templeton Emerging Markets Group for over three decades.

== Early life and education ==
Joseph Bernhard Mark Mobius was born to a German father and a Puerto Rican mother on 17 August 1936. His birthplace is reported variously as Hempstead, Long Island, or New York City. He grew up in Bellmore, Long Island.

He earned his B.A. in fine arts and an M.S. in communications from Boston University, and received a Ph.D in economics from the Massachusetts Institute of Technology in 1964. He also studied at the University of Wisconsin, University of New Mexico, and Kyoto University in Japan through the Overseas Training Program of Syracuse University.

== Career ==
Mobius worked at international securities firm Vickers, da Costa, and later was president of the International Investment Trust Company in Taipei, Taiwan. He ran an independent consulting company that marketed, among other things, Snoopy cartoon merchandise.

He joined Franklin Templeton in 1987 after being asked by John Templeton to run the Templeton Emerging Markets Group, one of the world's first emerging market funds. At Franklin Templeton he established and directed the research team based in 18 global emerging markets offices and managed more than $50 billion in emerging markets portfolios.

In 2015, after leading the company for over a quarter of a century, Mobius decided to step down as the lead manager of the Templeton Emerging Markets Investment Trust (TEMIT) and handed over control of the fund to Carlos Hardenberg.

In 2018, Franklin Templeton announced Mobius's retirement from Franklin Templeton effective 31 January 2018.

In March 2018, Mobius launched Mobius Capital Partners together with his former Templeton colleagues Carlos von Hardenberg and Greg Konieczny. The emerging and frontier markets asset manager is focused on a single long-only strategy based on actively partnering with portfolio companies to improve their corporate governance and to deliver a clear ESG pathway.

== Personal life and death ==
Born a U.S. citizen, Mobius was also entitled to German citizenship by descent. He renounced his U.S. citizenship while living his life as a German citizen.

Mobius stated his preference for a Donald Trump victory in the 2020 United States Presidential election and called a potential win by the Biden–Harris ticket "disastrous" for the stock market and economy.

On 2 March 2023, Mobius told Fox Business in an interview that he could not take his money out of China due to the country's capital controls. He also said that he would be "very, very careful" investing in the country. According to the South China Morning Post, Mobius had sold a flat in Shanghai 18 years ago and deposited the money at a Shanghai branch of HSBC. When he tried to transfer 3 million yuan ($432,270) to a HSBC Hong Kong account, he was asked to submit an extensive list of documents related to the sale and taxation records which delayed the process. On 7 March, according to Bloomberg News, Mobius told Ming Pao that the issue "seems to have resolved". However Mobius remained critical of capital controls in China, stating that removing capital outflow restrictions would benefit that country's economy.

Mobius died in Singapore on 15 April 2026, at the age of 89.
