= Hugo Vickers =

British writer and broadcaster

- Born: Hugo Ralph Vickers; 12 November 1951 (age 74); Lambeth, London, England
- Education: Eton College; University of Strasbourg
- Occupations: Author, broadcaster, biographer
- Spouse: Elizabeth Vickers (m. 1995)
- Children: 3

Hugo Ralph Vickers DL (born 12 November 1951) is an English writer, broadcaster and biographer.

He is the author of numerous biographies and works on the British royal family, including Elizabeth, the Queen Mother, Alice: Princess Andrew of Greece, Vivien Leigh: A Biography and Clarissa: Muse to Power.

== Early life ==
The son of Ralph Cecil Vickers, M.C., a stockbroker, senior partner in the firm of Vickers, da Costa, by his marriage in 1950 to Dulcie Metcalf, Vickers was born in Lambeth and educated at Eton in the late 1960s and then at Strasbourg University. He has a younger sister, Imogen. His aunt was the politician Baroness Vickers.

He is a liveryman of the Worshipful Company of Musicians.

=== Other activities ===
Vickers was appointed chairman of the Jubilee Walkway Trust in October 2002, which had been founded in 1977 as a lasting memory of the Queen's Silver Jubilee, and later refurbished and updated to commemorate her Golden Jubilee. Being in this role, he welcomed Queen Elizabeth II and her consort, Prince Philip, Duke of Edinburgh, to the Mall to celebrate the fiftieth anniversary of the Queen's coronation in 2003, and again on 19 November 2007, when the royal couple unveiled the Diamond Wedding panoramic panel in Parliament Square. He is also the chairman of the Outdoor Trust which puts Walkways into Commonwealth countries.

Vickers is one of the Deputy Lieutenants of Berkshire.

== Personal life ==
In September 1995, Vickers married Elizabeth Vickers, a second cousin. They have two sons and a daughter.

== Selected works ==
- We Want The Queen (Debrett's Peerage, 1977)
- Gladys, Duchess of Marlborough (Weidenfeld and Nicolson, 1979)
- The Debrett's Book of the Royal Wedding (Debrett's, 1981)
- Cecil Beaton: the Authorized Biography (1985)
- Vivien Leigh: A Biography (Hamish Hamilton, 1988)
- Loving Garbo: The Story of Greta Garbo, Cecil Beaton and Mercedes de Acosta (Penguin Random House, 1994; Pimlico, 1995)
- Royal Orders: Honours and the Honoured (Pan Macmillan, 1994, ISBN 9781852835101)
- The Kiss: The Story of an Obsession (1996)
- Alice: Princess Andrew of Greece (2000)
- Elizabeth, the Queen Mother (Hutchinson, 2005)
- Alexis: the Memoirs of the Baron de Rede (The Dovecote Press, 2005)
- Frances Campbell-Preston, The Rich Spoils of Time (The Dovecote Press, 2006, editor)
- St George's Chapel, Windsor Castle (3 (Windsor: The College of St George, 2008)
- The Royal Line of Succession (Royal Collection Enterprises Ltd, 2009)
- Behind Closed Doors: the tragic untold story of Wallis Simpson (Arrow, 2012)
- The Royal Mews at Buckingham Palace Official Souvenir Guide (Antique Collectors Club Ltd, 2012)
- James Pope-Hennessy, The Quest for Queen Mary (2018 edition, editor)
- The Crown: Truth and Fiction: an Analysis of the Netflix Series THE CROWN (Zuleika Short Books, 2017)
- The Crown Dissected (Zuleika, 2019)
- Malice in Wonderland: My Adventures in the World of Cecil Beaton (2021)
- Elstree 175: Celebrating 175 years of Elstree School (London: Unicorn, 2023) ISBN 978-1911397380
- Clarissa: Muse to Power, The Untold Story of Clarissa Eden, Countess of Avon (Hodder & Stoughton, 2024) ISBN 978-1399736770
- Queen Elizabeth II: A Personal History (Hodder & Stoughton, 2026) ISBN 978-1529355178

== Other publications ==
- Introduction to The Pursuit of Love by Nancy Mitford (London: The Folio Society, 1991)
- Introduction to The Unexpurgated Beaton by Cecil Beaton (Phoenix, 2003)
- Introduction to Beaton in the Sixties: More Unexpurgated Diaries (Phoenix, 2004)
