= Piers Dixon =

British politician (1928–2017)

Member of Parliament for Truro
- In office 18 June 1970 – 20 September 1974
- Preceded by: Geoffrey Wilson
- Succeeded by: David Penhaligon

Personal details
- Born: Pierson John Shirley Dixon; 29 December 1928
- Died: 24 March 2017 (aged 88)
- Party: Conservative
- Education: Eton College; Magdalene College, Cambridge; Harvard Business School
- Spouse(s): Edwina Sandys (m. 1960; div. 1970) Janet, Countess of Cowley Anne Cronin (m. 1984) Ann Mavroleon (m. 1994)
- Father: Sir Pierson Dixon
- Relatives: Hugo Dixon (son)

Pierson John Shirley Dixon (29 December 1928 – 24 March 2017), known as Piers Dixon, was a British Conservative Party politician who represented Truro between 1970 and 1974.

== Early life ==
The son of diplomat and writer, Sir Pierson Dixon, he was educated at Eton College; Magdalene College, Cambridge; and Harvard Business School. He worked as a stockbroker.

== Career ==
Dixon contested Brixton at the 1966 general election and was elected Member of Parliament (MP) for Truro in 1970. He was re-elected in February 1974, but lost the seat to the Liberal David Penhaligon in the October 1974 general election, by 464 votes (0.8%).

No Conservative MP represented Truro after Dixon's defeat until Sarah Newton regained the seat from the Liberal Democrats in 2010. Alan Clark noted Dixon in his 1983–92 diaries, writing "when (the Liberals) get stuck in, really stuck in, they are devilish hard to dislodge".

== Interests ==
Dixon was a member of the Monday Club and the Bow Group.

== Personal life ==
Dixon married four times. His first wife was the sculptor Edwina Sandys, a daughter of Duncan Sandys and Diana Churchill. They had two sons, Mark and Hugo. The second was Janet, Countess of Cowley. In 1984, Dixon married Anne Cronin, daughter of John Desmond Cronin, former Labour MP; they had one son, Alexander. In 1994, he married Ann Mavroleon, daughter of John Davenport.

== Death ==
He died in March 2017 at the age of 88.

Parliament of the United Kingdom
Preceded by Geoffrey Wilson	Member of Parliament for Truro; 1970 – October 1974	Succeeded by David Penhaligon
