= Robin Ibbs =

English business executive and government advisor

Sir Robin Ibbs KBE
- Born: John Ibbs; 21 April 1926; Birmingham, United Kingdom
- Died: 27 July 2014 (aged 88)
- Education: West House School, Trinity College, Cambridge
- Occupations: Banker, Adviser
- Spouse(s): Iris Barbara Hall (1952 – 2005, deceased); Penelope Ann Buckland (2006 – 2014)
- Children: One

Sir John Robin Ibbs, KBE (21 April 1926 – 27 July 2014) was an English business executive, government advisor and Royal Navy officer. He was Chairman of Lloyds Bank from 1993 to 1997 and of Lloyds TSB Group PLC from 1995 to 1997 and also served as Margaret Thatcher’s part time adviser from 1983–1988.

== Life ==
Born in 1926 in Birmingham, England, Ibbs was the only son of Professor T. L. Ibbs MC DSc, and his wife, Marjorie (née Bell). He was educated at West House Prep School, Gresham's School, Upper Canada College (Toronto), the University of Toronto, and Trinity College, Cambridge, where he graduated MA in Mechanical Sciences.

From 1947 to 1949, Ibbs served in the Royal Navy as an Instructor Lieutenant, then worked for C. A. Parsons & Co. Ltd, from 1949 to 1951 while also reading for a career as a barrister at Lincoln's Inn. He was called to the Bar in 1952. He joined ICI in 1952 and was a Director, from 1976 to 1980 and again, from 1982 to 1988, serving the two intervening years on secondment as Head of the Central Policy Review Staff in the Cabinet Office.

From 1983 to 1988, he was part-time adviser to Margaret Thatcher on Efficiency and Effectiveness in Government.

On 10 April 1984, Gordon Brown asked the Prime Minister in the House of Commons "whether her efficiency adviser Sir Robin Ibbs has the status of a temporary civil servant, what are the terms and conditions of appointment, including the salary paid, of her adviser on efficiency Sir Robin Ibbs; if she will publish the formal exchange of letters which preceded the appointment of Sir Robin Ibbs as her adviser on efficiency." Mrs Thatcher replied that "Sir Robin Ibbs is not a civil servant. His appointment as my adviser on efficiency is on a part-time basis, and is unpaid. It would not be appropriate to publish the exchange of letters on appointment."

Ibbs was appointed as Chairman of Lloyds Merchant Bank Holdings in 1989, continuing until 1992, and was simultaneously Deputy Chairman of Lloyds Bank Canada, from 1989 until 1990. He was Deputy Chairman of Lloyds Bank from 1988 to 1993 and Chairman from 1993 to 1997, and also Chairman of Lloyds TSB Group PLC from 1995 to 1997. Outside his professional career, Ibbs was a member of the Council of the Confederation of British Industry from 1982 to 1987, of the Court of the Cranfield Institute of Technology from 1983 to 1988, and Chairman of the Council of University College, London, from 1989 to 1995.

He died on 27 July 2014 at the age of 88.

== Marriages ==
In 1952, Ibbs married firstly Iris Barbara Hall; the couple had one daughter. Lady Ibbs died in 2005. In 2006, he married secondly, to Penelope Ann, daughter of Captain H. C. Buckland.

== 30-year rule re documents ==
At the end of 2011, the release of confidential documents under the UK Government's 30-year rule revealed Ibbs' thoughts regarding the Liverpool Riots. He wrote in an internal memo: "The unpalatable truth may be that decline is unlikely to be halted; if so the harsh implications need to be analysed and faced up to."

== Honours ==
- Knight Bachelor, 1982 Birthday Honours
- Hon. Doctor of Sciences, University of Bradford, 1986
- Knight Commander of the Order of the British Empire, 1988
- Hon. Doctor of Laws, University of Bath, 1993
- Hon. Bencher of Lincoln's Inn, 1999
- Hon. Fellow of University College, London, 1993

== Publications ==
- Improving Management in Government: The Next Steps (HMSO, February 1988)

Government offices
Preceded by Sir Kenneth Berrill	Director-General of the Central Policy Review Staff; 1980–1982	Succeeded by Sir John Sparrow
