= Diana Churchill =

Daughter of Winston Churchill (1909–1963)

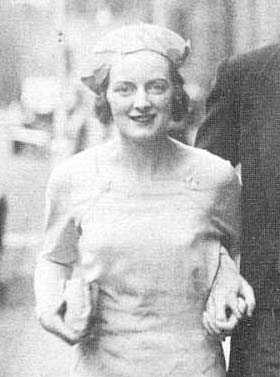
- Churchill in 1935
- Born: Diana Spencer Churchill; 11 July 1909; Pimlico, London, England
- Died: 20 October 1963 (aged 54); Westminster, London, England
- Education: Royal Academy of Dramatic Art
- Spouses: John Milner Bailey (m. 1932; div. 1935); Duncan Sandys (m. 1935; div. 1960)
- Children: 3, including Edwina Sandys
- Parents: Winston Churchill (father); Clementine Hozier (mother)

Diana Spencer Churchill (11 July 1909 – 20 October 1963) was the eldest daughter of British statesman Winston Churchill and Clementine Churchill.

== Personal life ==
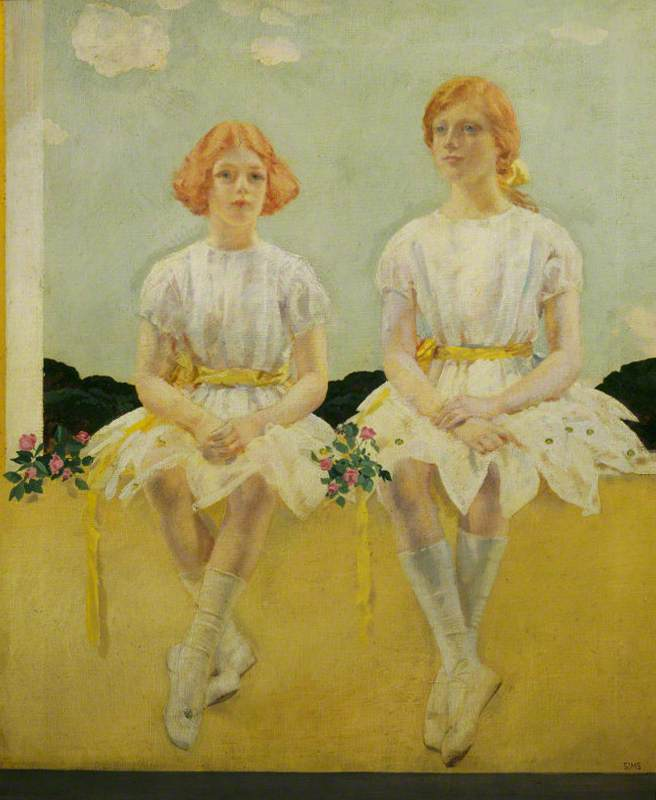
Charles Sims, Two Girls Seated: Diana and Sarah Churchill, 1922, National Trust, Chartwell

Diana Churchill was born at 33 Eccleston Square, London, on 11 July 1909, the first of five children of Winston Churchill – then a member of Parliament and government minister – and Clementine Hozier. She attended Notting Hill High School and then the Royal Academy of Dramatic Art, where she spent five terms, although her focus was not on acting.

On 12 December 1932, Churchill married John Milner Bailey (15 June 1900 East Grinstead – 13 February 1946 Cape Town, South Africa), who became the Bailey baronet Sir John Milner Bailey, 2nd Bt, but the marriage was unsuccessful and they divorced in 1935. On 16 September 1935, she married the Conservative politician Duncan Sandys (later life peer Lord Duncan-Sandys). They had three children together and divorced in 1960.

In 1962, Churchill changed her name by deed poll back to Diana Spencer Churchill.

=== Children ===
With Duncan Sandys she had three children:

- The Honourable Julian Sandys (19 September 1936 – 15 August 1997). He married Elisabeth Martin in 1970. They had four children:
  - Lucy Diana Sandys (born 1971); she married David Pite in 2007. They have two children.
  - Duncan John Winston Sandys (b. 1973); he married Mary Brown C. Brewer and divorced in 2016. They have one son.
  - Jonathan Martin Edwin Sandys (1975–2018); he married Sara Hill in 2009. They had two children, who are the first descendants of Sir Winston Churchill to be born in the United States (Texas).
  - Roderick Julian Frederick Sandys (1977 – 9 December 2007)
- The Honourable Edwina Sandys (b. 29 December 1938); she married Piers Dixon in 1960 and divorced in 1973. They had two sons. She married Richard D. Kaplan in 1985.
  - Mark Pierson Dixon (b. 1962)
  - Hugo Duncan Dixon (b. 1963)
- The Honourable Celia Sandys (b. 18 May 1943); she married Michael Kennedy in 1965 and divorced in 1970. They have one son. She married Sir Dennis Walters in 1970 and divorced in 1979. They have one son. She married Maj.-Gen. Kenneth Perkins in 1985. They have two children.
  - Justin Kennedy (b. 1967)
  - Dominic Walters (b. 1971)
  - Alexander Winston Duncan Perkins (b. 1986)
  - Sophie Rachel Perkins (b. 1988)

== Military service ==
Churchill was an officer in the Women's Royal Naval Service during World War II.

== Health problems and suicide ==
Churchill had several nervous breakdowns. In 1962, she began working with the Samaritans, an organisation created for the prevention of suicide. On 20 October 1963, she died at 58 Chester Row, Westminster, S.W.1, leaving an estate valued at £59,259. The cause of death was an overdose of barbiturates, and a coroner later concluded that it was a case of suicide. She is buried with her parents (who both outlived her) and her siblings (Marigold originally was interred in a tomb at Kensal Green Cemetery in London, but her remains were relocated in 2019 to join the rest of her family) at St Martin's Church, Bladon, near Woodstock, Oxfordshire.
