= Claud Russell =

British diplomat

Sir Claud Russell KCMG FRGS FZS
- Born: 8 December 1871
- Died: 9 December 1959 (aged 88)
- Education: University of Oxford
- Occupation: Diplomat
- Spouse: Virginia Athenais Atchley
- Parent(s): Arthur Russell; Laura Peyronnet

Sir Claud Frederick William Russell KCMG FRGS FZS (8 December 1871 – 9 December 1959) was a British diplomat. He served as minister to Ethiopia and to Switzerland, and ambassador to Portugal.

== Biography ==
Russell was the second son of Lord Arthur Russell. He was educated privately and at Balliol College, Oxford. He joined the Diplomatic Service in 1897, was promoted to Third Secretary, then to Second Secretary in September 1902. He served in British embassies or legations in Turkey, Egypt, China, France, Russia, Morocco, Argentina, Paraguay, Spain, Greece, and in the Foreign Office. At the outbreak of World War 1, he was released from the Foreign Office to serve in the Bedfordshire Yeomanry, rising to the rank of major. After the war, in 1919 he was appointed British delegate to, and president of, the international financial commission which had been established in Athens following the Unfortunate War to oversee the public finances of Greece, and also to the Inter-Allied Financial Commission that oversaw loans to help the Greek government recover from the war. Russell was then appointed Minister to Ethiopia 1920–1925; Minister to Switzerland 1928–1931; and Ambassador to Portugal 1931–1935.

Claud Russell was knighted KCMG in the King's Birthday Honours of 1930. The Portuguese government awarded him the Grand Cross of the Order of Christ. During World War 2, at the age of 69, Sir Claud enlisted in the Home Guard. He rented Trematon Castle 1939–1959 and died there on his 88th birthday.

As Ambassador to Lisbon he was one of very few senior diplomats to write favourably on whether women should be admitted to the Diplomatic Service. In his contribution to the Shuster Committee review in 1934 he said, "I have an instinctive prejudice in favour of change, which I associate with improvement and reform ... I do not see why a woman should not cohabit at her post with her husband [particularly if he were] a man of letters or a craftsman of any sort ... We live in a changing world, and no-one can say how mankind will regard anything in 1959. Who would have foreseen in 1894 that in twenty-five years women would be made eligible for the House of Commons?"

== Personal life ==
Russell married Athenais Atchley, daughter of Shirley Atchley in 1920.

== Ancestry ==
Ancestors of Claud Russell

John Russell
George Russell
Georgiana Byng
Arthur Russell
John Rawdon
Elizabeth Rawdon
Frances Hall-Stevenson
Claud Russell
Paul Peyronnet
Laura Peyronnet
George Whitfield
Georgina Whitfield
Georgiana Ross

Diplomatic posts
Preceded by Wilfred Thesiger	Envoy Extraordinary and Minister Plenipotentiary to Ethiopia; 1920–1925	Succeeded by Charles Bentinck
Preceded by Rowland Sperling	Envoy Extraordinary and Minister Plenipotentiary to the Swiss Confederation; 1928–1931	Succeeded by Sir Howard Kennard
Preceded by Sir Francis Lindley	Ambassador Extraordinary and Plenipotentiary to the Portuguese Repuplic; 1931–1935	Succeeded by Sir Charles Wingfield
