= Edwina Sandys =

English sculptor

The Honourable Edwina Sandys MBE
- Born: 22 December 1938 (age 87)
- Occupation: Artist
- Spouses: Piers Dixon (m. 1960; div. 1970); Richard D. Kaplan (m. 1985; died 2016)
- Children: 2, including Hugo Dixon
- Parent(s): Duncan Sandys; Diana Churchill
- Relatives: Winston Churchill (grandfather)

Edwina Sandys (born 22 December 1938) is an English artist and sculptor.

== Early life ==
The daughter of Duncan Sandys, and a granddaughter of Winston Churchill, Sandys was a debutante and was presented to Queen Elizabeth II. After attending a genteel girls’ school, she went to Paris, then had a job "answering the doorbell" for a dress designer, and a stint as a secretary. She later became a Sunday Telegraph columnist and a novelist. Her career as a visual artist began in 1970.

== Notable works ==
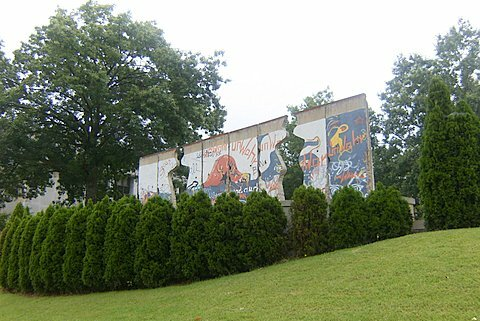
"Breakthrough"

Sandys' work titled "Breakthrough", at Westminster College, Fulton, Missouri, features eight sections of the Berlin Wall. The college was the site of her grandfather Sir Winston Churchill's famous "Iron Curtain" speech in 1946 and is now the site of the National Churchill Museum. The silhouette cutouts from the Wall segments became the premise of another work, "BreakFree", displayed at the Franklin D. Roosevelt Presidential Library and Museum in Hyde Park, New York.

Sandys also worked with the Missouri University of Science and Technology, located in Rolla, Missouri, to use a new way to make deep cuts in granite to create the Millennium Arch sculpture which stands across the campus from their Stonehenge monument. The Arch is a single trilithon with a vague silhouette of a man and a woman on each of its supporting megaliths, several meters from the arch.

In an interview with New York Social Diary Edwina discusses one of her more well known works, "Christa". Edwina describes her reasoning behind the sculpture, explaining that though she is not a religious person, she felt the need to represent women within what's often considered the most important image: Jesus on the cross. She states that the sculpture showed the suffering of women as well.

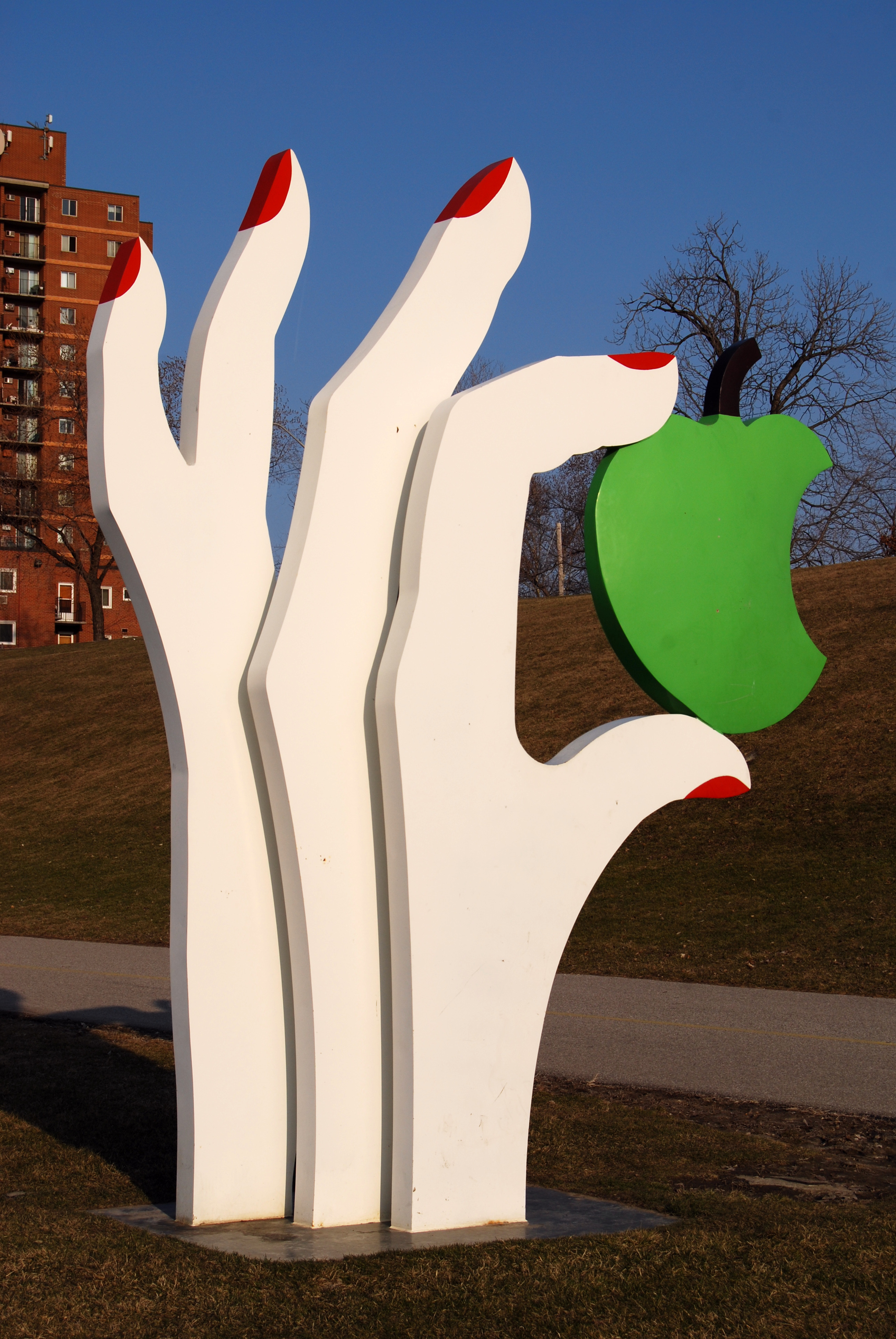
Edwina Sandys' Eve's Apple in Odette Sculpture Park in Windsor, Ontario

== Publications ==
Her published works include the book Edwina Sandys Art, and an illustrated quiz book entitled Social Intercourse.

== Honours ==
- MBE 1984 New Year Honours for services to British cultural interests in New York.

== Personal life ==
She is the eldest daughter and second child of Baron Duncan-Sandys and Diana Churchill, and a granddaughter of the statesman Sir Winston Churchill.

She married Piers Dixon in 1960 and they were divorced in 1970. They have two sons, Mark Pierson Dixon (b. 1962) and Hugo Duncan Dixon (b. 1963).

She married the architect Richard D. Kaplan in 1985; he died in 2016.
