= Peter Thal Larsen =

Dutch journalist

Peter Thal Larsen is a Dutch journalist.

Thal Larsen graduated from Bristol University before going on to the London School of Economics. He began working for the Financial Times in 1999 and moved to the paper's New York City office the following year, first as a financial correspondent and then U.S. communications editor. He returned to London in 2004 to become banking editor, leading the paper's coverage of the 2008 financial crisis and the 2008 United Kingdom bank rescue package. In 2009, he departed to become Reuters' European comment editor, reporting to Jonathan Ford. Following Reuters' acquisition of Breakingviews later that year he became assistant editor of Reuters Breakingviews. In 2012, he moved to Hong Kong to take up a new position within Reuters as the Asia editor for Breakingviews. In 2017, he became Breakingviews' EMEA editor. In 2022, he was named global editor of the organisation.

Thal Larsen was one of a number of senior financial journalists who reported on the effects of the 2008 financial crisis on The Royal Bank of Scotland, and was interviewed by Ian Fraser for a 2011 BBC Two documentary on the topic.
