= Georgina Frances de Peyronnet =

British journalist (1815–1895)

Georgina Frances, Vicomtesse de Peyronnet (née Whitfield; 15 April 1815 – 8 July 1895) was a British journalist.

== Early life ==
Georgina Frances Whitfield was born on St Vincent in the British West Indies on 15 April 1815. She was a daughter of Georgiana Paulina (née Ross) Whitfield (a daughter of Andrew Ross) and George Whitfield, who owned slave plantations in the West Indies. Her maternal uncle, Henry James Ross, subsequently bought her father's plantations.

Not long after she was born, Georgina moved to England with her mother before settling in France in c. 1822.

== Career ==
Georgina wrote for the Edinburgh Review and worked as a correspondent for The Times during the Franco-Prussian War. She was also likely responsible for most of the translation of the French edition of Lord Macaulay's The History of England by her husband, published in 1861.

== Personal life ==
On 3 February 1835, Georgina married Paul Louis Jules, Vicomte de Peyronnet, in London. His father opposed the marriage and "stopped his allowance" after the marriage after which her income from the West Indies plantations supported their lifestyle. Together, they were the parents of three daughters, including:

- Laura de Peyronnet (1837–1910), who married Lord Arthur Russell, son of Lord George Russell (second son of the 6th Duke of Bedford).
- Marie Madeleine Claire de Peyronnet (1837–1913), who died unmarried.
- Isabelle Raymonde de Peyronnet (1841–1927), who married, as his third wife, George Browne, 3rd Marquess of Sligo.

Georgina died on 8 July 1895 at 1 Hyde Park Place in London. She is buried in Kensal Green Cemetery.

=== Descendants ===
Through her daughter Laura, she was a grandmother of watercolour painter Flora Russell, diplomat Claud Russell, Maj. Gilbert Byng Alwyne Russell, and writer Conrad Russell.
