= Kenneth Berrill =

English economist and public servant

Sir Kenneth Berrill GBE KCB
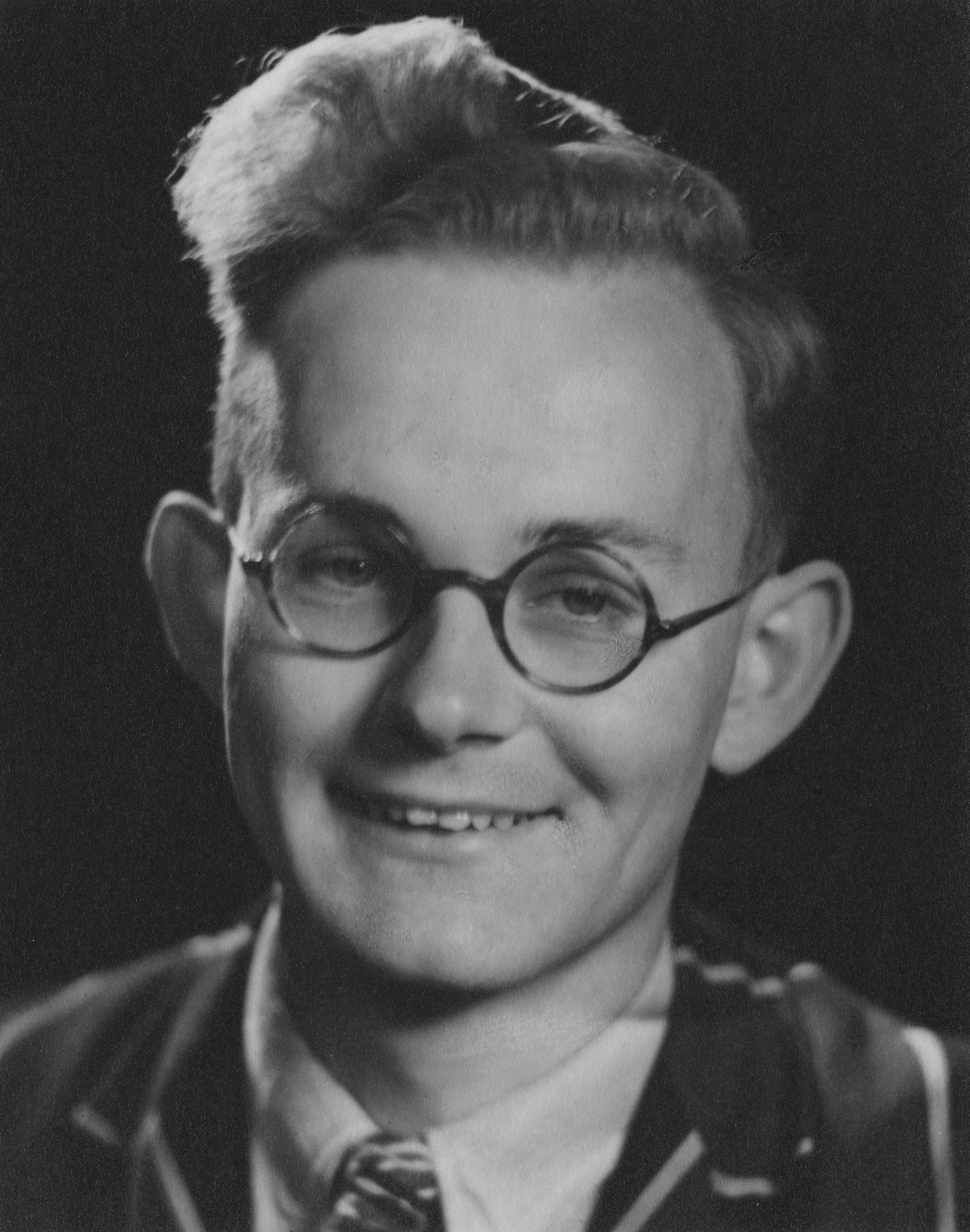
- Berrill in 1939/1940
- Born: Kenneth Ernest Berrill; 28 August 1920; London, England,
- Died: 30 April 2009 (aged 88); Grantchester, England
- Occupations: Civil servant and economist

Sir Kenneth Ernest Berrill GBE, KCB, (28 August 1920 – 30 April 2009), was an English economist and public servant.

== Early life and education ==
Born at Stoke Newington, London, Berrill was the son Stanley Ernest Berrill (1896–1984), a clerk at a men's outfitters, and Lilian May (née Blakeley). He won a scholarship to University College London to train as a geography teacher, working at Romford greyhound stadium in the evenings. He subsequently transferred to the London School of Economics, where he read economics, taking a degree in 1941, then served in the Royal Electrical and Mechanical Engineers during World War II. He returned to LSE, completing an MA in 1949.

== Career ==
After taking his MA, Berrill was a fellow and bursar at St Catharine's College, Cambridge, moving in 1962 to King's, where he remained until 1969. At this time, he was developing a reputation as an economic adviser, including for the World Bank, OECD, and for overseas governments. In 1967, he was appointed a special adviser to the Treasury.

Throughout his career, he held a number of posts including chief economic adviser to the Treasury in the closing months of Edward Heath's premiership, and head of the Central Policy Review Staff from 1974 to 1980 and the chairmanship of the Securities and Investments Board until 1988. He was awarded an Honorary Degree (Doctor of Laws) by the University of Bath in 1974.

In 1950, he was member of an Anglo-Swiss expedition which was the first to climb Abi Gamin.

In 1981, he became the senior partner of the prominent City stockbroking firm of Vickers da Costa.

== Personal life ==
In 1941, Berrill married Brenda West, with whom he had a son; he married secondly, in 1950, June Phillips, with whom he had a son and a daughter, and married thirdly, in 1977, Jane Marris.

Government offices
Preceded by The Lord Rothschild	Director-General of the Central Policy Review Staff; 1974–1980	Succeeded by Sir Robin Ibbs
