= Jack Churchill (1880–1947) =

British military officer (1880–1947)

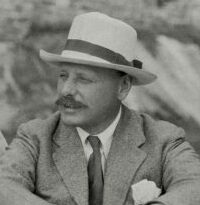
- Churchill in 1929

Personal details
- Born: John Strange Spencer-Churchill; 4 February 1880 Dublin, Ireland
- Died: 23 February 1947 (aged 67)
- Resting place: St. Martin's Churchyard Bladon, West Oxfordshire District, Oxfordshire, England
- Spouse: Lady Gwendoline Bertie (m. 1908; died 1941)
- Children: John; Henry; Clarissa
- Parents: Lord Randolph Churchill; Jennie Jerome
- Occupation: Soldier; Businessman
- Known for: Brother of Winston Churchill

Military service
- Branch/service: British Army
- Years of service: 1898–1918
- Rank: Major
- Unit: Queen's Own Oxfordshire Hussars; South African Light Horse; Mediterranean Expeditionary Force
- Battles/wars: Second Boer War; First World War
- Awards: Distinguished Service Order; Territorial Decoration; Croix de guerre Legion of Honour

Major John Strange Spencer-Churchill (Note: This British person has the double-barrelled surname Spencer-Churchill, but is known by the surname Churchill.) DSO TD (4 February 1880 – 23 February 1947) was the younger son of Lord Randolph Churchill and his wife Jennie, and the brother of Sir Winston Churchill.

== Early life ==
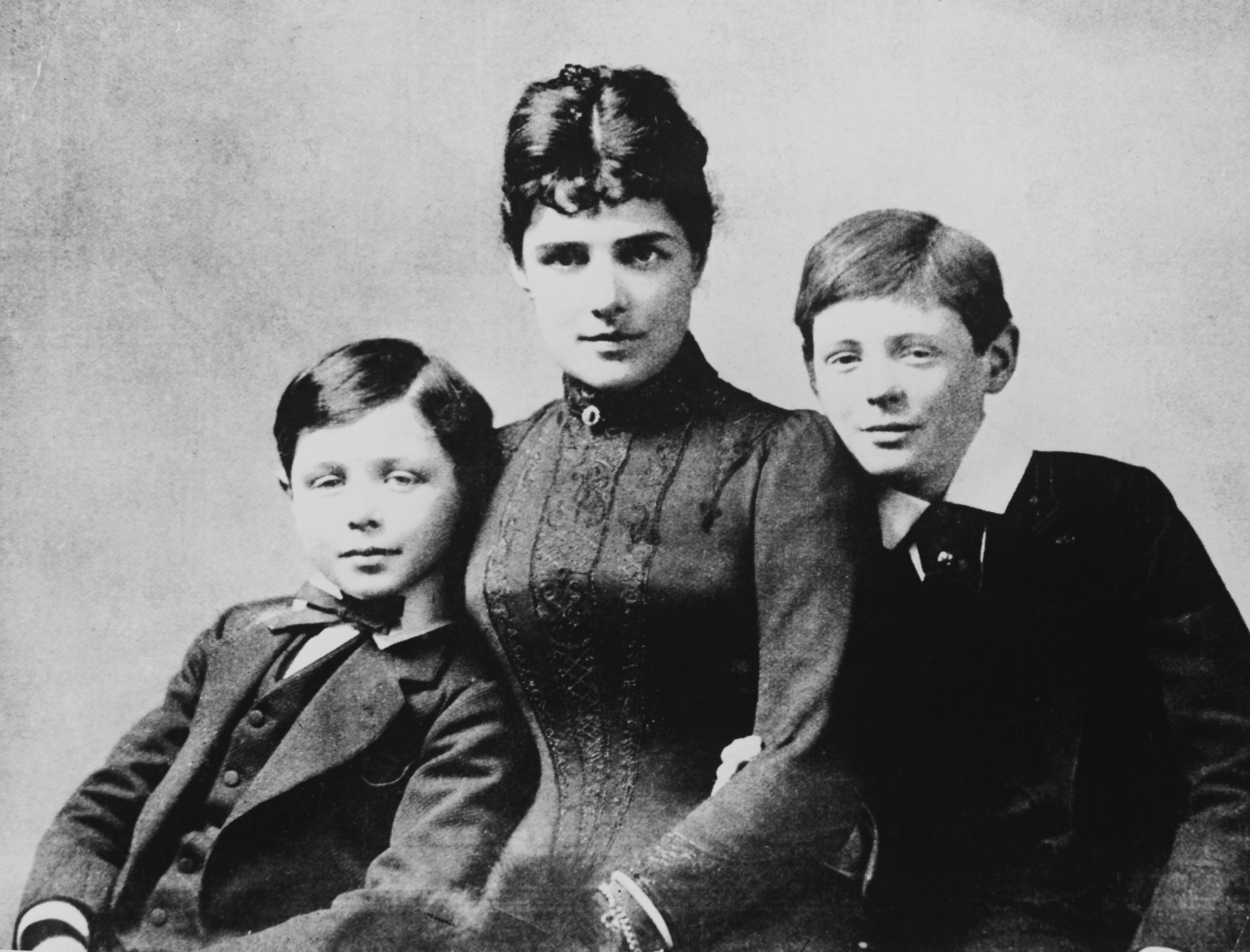
Jennie Churchill with her sons, Jack and Winston in 1889

Churchill was born on 4 February 1880, at Phoenix Park, Dublin, Ireland, where his father, Lord Randolph, was secretary to Churchill's grandfather, the 7th Duke of Marlborough, then Viceroy of Ireland.

Churchill was educated at Harrow School in England. His mother's sisters believed that Churchill's actual biological father was Evelyn Boscawen, although that was mostly discredited due to his striking resemblance with his father and brother.

== Career ==
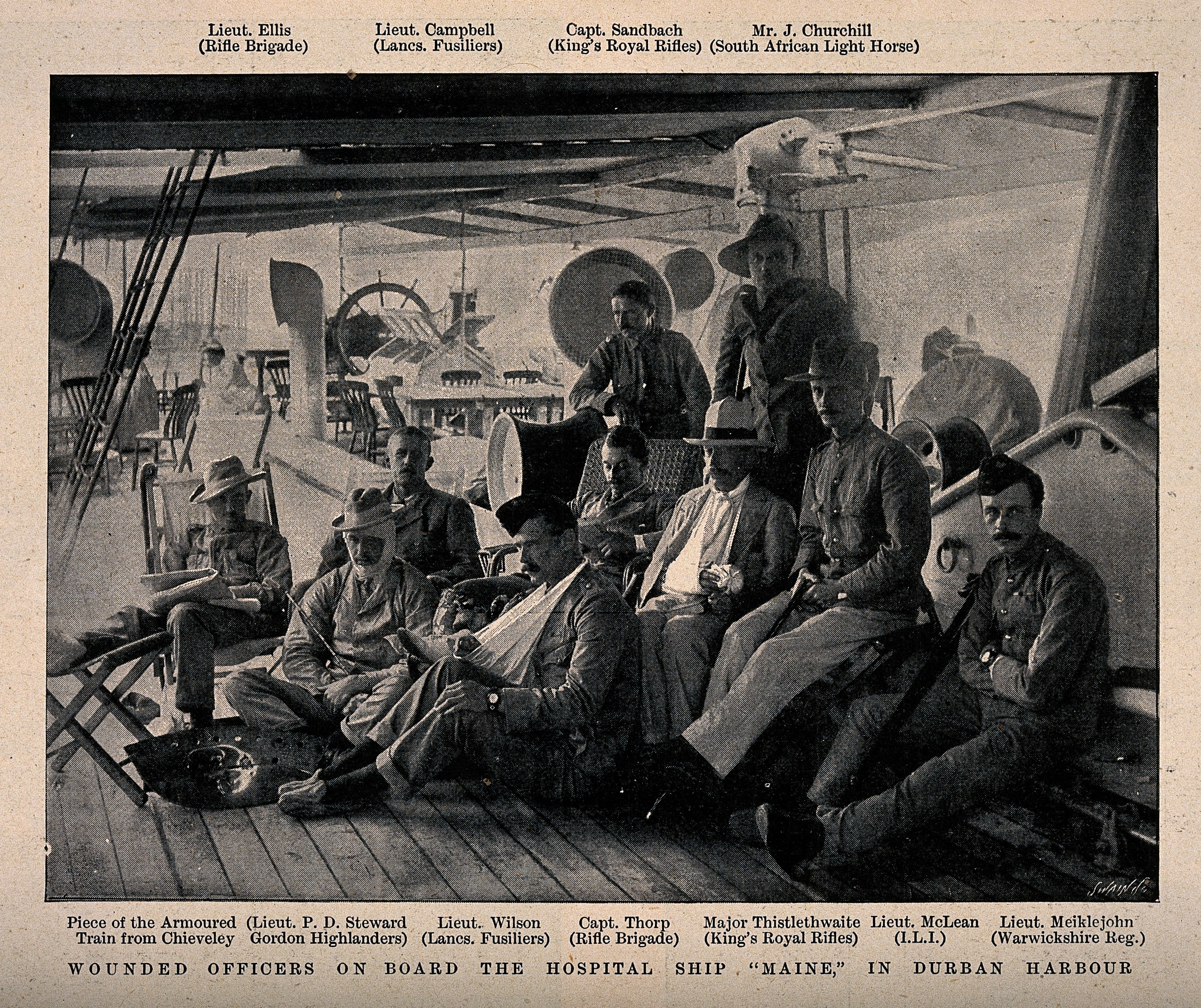
Boer War, wounded army officers on the deck of a hospital ship, including Churchill. The Graphic 1900

Churchill was commissioned into the Queen's Own Oxfordshire Hussars in 1898. He served in the South African Light Horse alongside his war correspondent brother in the Second Boer War in 1899–1900. He was shot through the leg in February 1900, during the Battle of the Tugela Heights, part of the campaign for the relief of Ladysmith. The following month he returned for duty. For his service, he was mentioned in dispatches.

He fought in World War I, where he was again mentioned in dispatches. He served on the staff of Field Marshal Sir John French, General Sir Ian Hamilton (serving as Naval Liaison Officer for the Mediterranean Expeditionary Force) and General Birdwood (serving as Camp Commandant, 1st Anzac Corps, and then as Assistant Military Secretary at the headquarters of the Fifth Army).

He reached the rank of major and was awarded the French decorations of the Croix de guerre and the Légion d'honneur and the British Distinguished Service Order in 1918. After the war, he became a businessman in the City of London firstly as a partner at stockbrokers Nelke, Phillips & Bendix from 1906 and then at Vickers, da Costa, making partner in 1921.

During World War II, after the widowed Churchill lost his house during the Blitz, he lived in 10 Downing Street (where he used the bedrooms on the top floor formerly used by his brother Winston and his wife) or in the No 10 Annex.

== Personal life ==
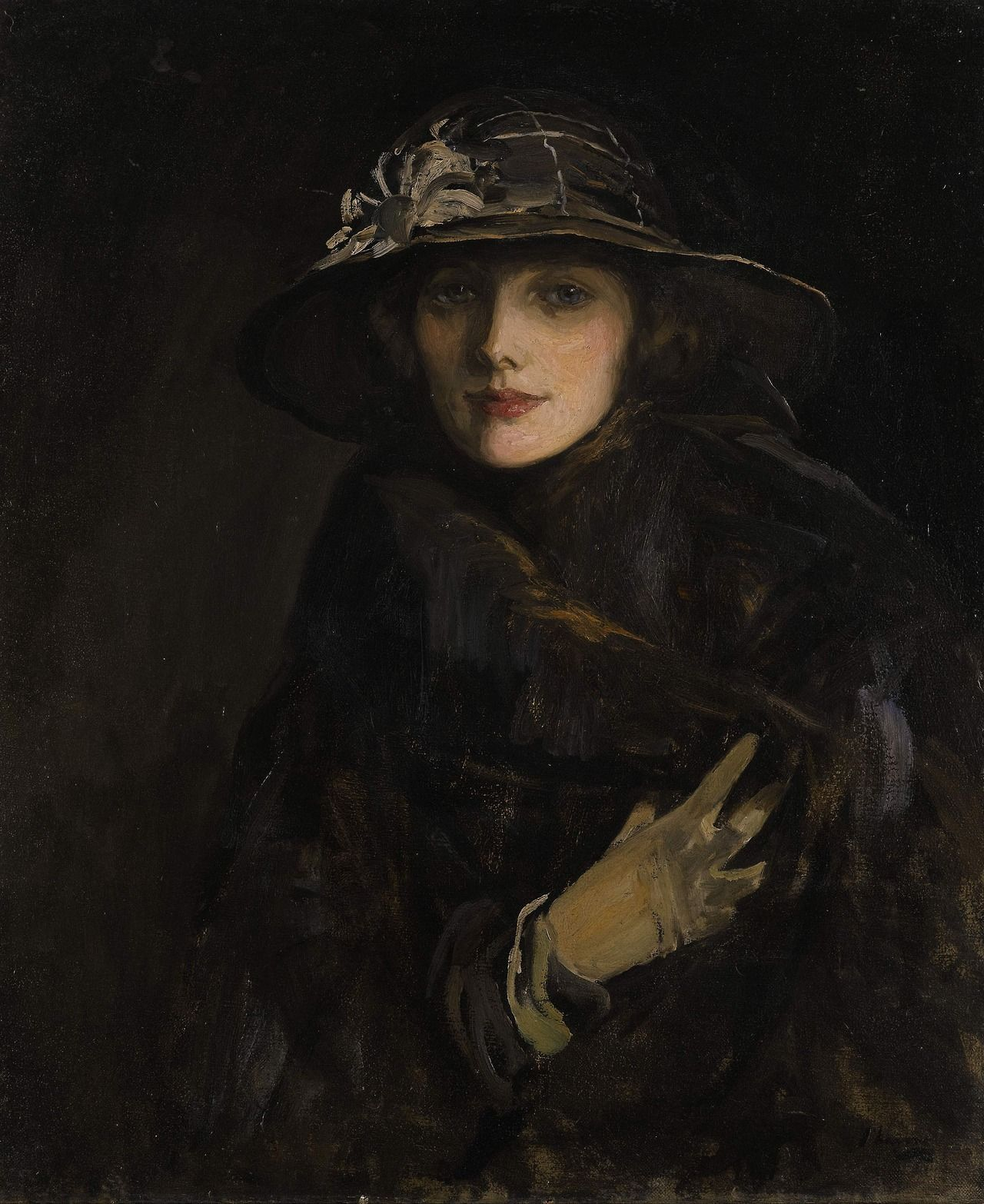
Gwendoline Bertie by John Lavery

On 8 August 1908, Churchill married Lady Gwendoline Theresa Mary "Goonie" Bertie (20 November 1885 – 7 July 1941), the daughter of Montagu Bertie, 7th Earl of Abingdon, and Gwendoline Mary Dormer. Lady Gwendoline had been raised as a Roman Catholic. Churchill and his wife had three children:

- John George Spencer-Churchill (1909–1992)
- Henry Winston "Peregrine" Spencer-Churchill (1913–2002), who married Yvonne Henriette Mary Jehannin (1924–2010).
- Anne Clarissa Spencer-Churchill, later Countess of Avon (1920–2021), the wife of prime minister Anthony Eden.

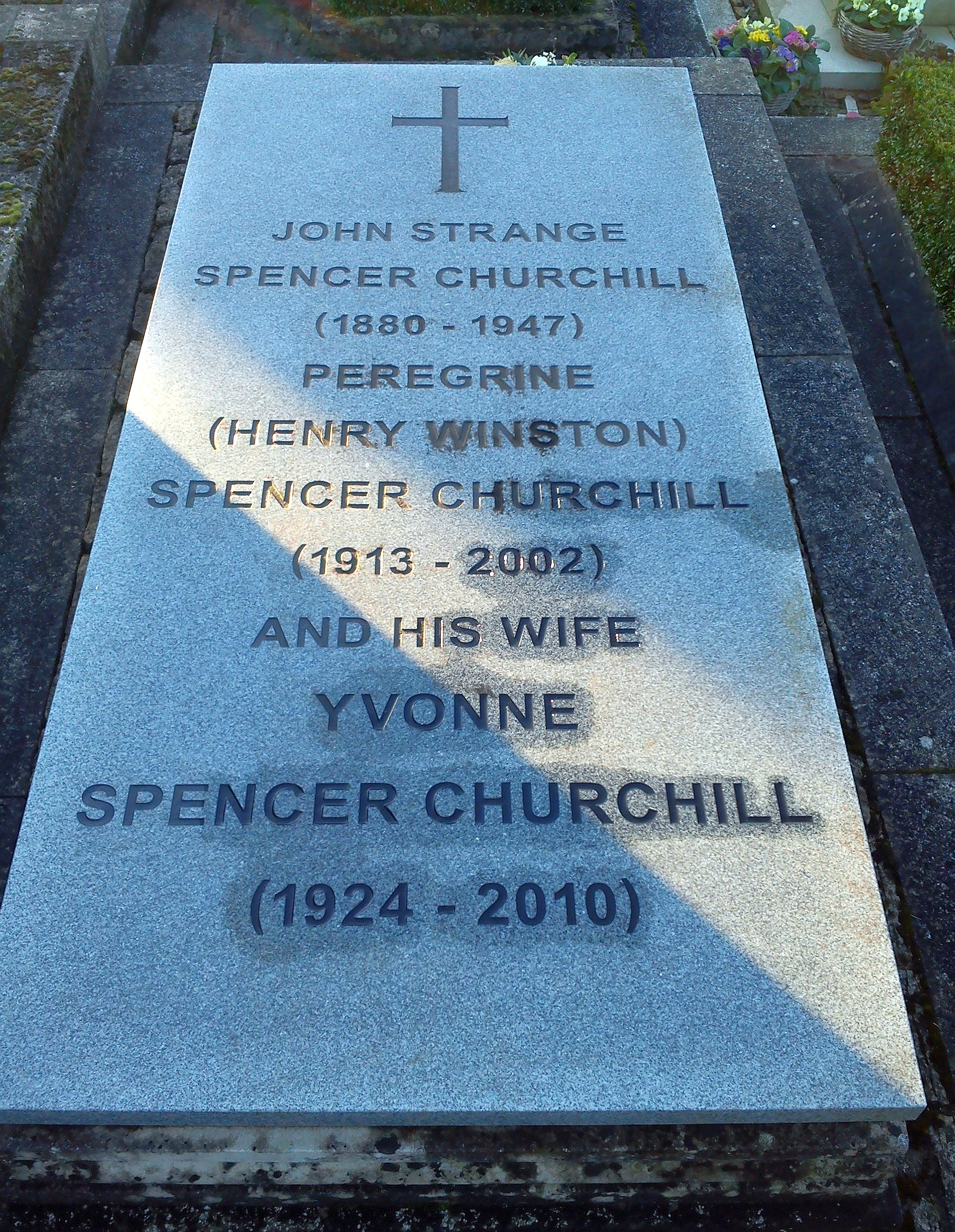
John Strange Spencer-Churchill's grave at St Martin's Church, Bladon

Churchill died on 23 February 1947, aged 67, of heart disease. He is buried near his parents and brother (who outlived him for 18 years) at St Martin's Church, Bladon, near Woodstock, Oxfordshire.

It was later discovered that Clarissa's biological father was the Liberal politician Harold Baker, who had had an affair with Lady Gwendoline in 1919.
