= Conrad Russell (letter writer) =

English farmer and letter writer

- Born: 3 April 1878
- Died: 27 April 1947 (aged 69)
- Allegiance: British Empire
- Education: University of Oxford

Conrad Russell (3 April 1878 – 27 April 1947) was an English farmer and letter writer, who carried on lengthy and intimate correspondences with some of the most celebrated society beauties of his day, including Diana Cooper, Daphne Thynne, and Deborah Cavendish.

== Life ==
Russell was the youngest of the six children of Lord Arthur Russell and Laura, the daughter of Paul Louis Jules, Vicomte de Peyronnet. He was accordingly a nephew of the Duke of Bedford, and a cousin of the philosopher Bertrand Russell, as well as of the latter's son, his namesake Conrad Russell. He was educated privately, at home and abroad, before attending Balliol College, Oxford, where he formed part of a celebrated generation which included his friends Raymond Asquith, John Buchan, Aubrey Herbert, and Auberon Herbert.

Post Oxford, Russell engaged in a number of occupations (including employment in the Colonial Office and in the City), none of which he found wholly satisfactory. In World War 1, he served in (among other units) the Bedfordshire Yeomanry and the 8th Hussars. A number of his friends were killed and he developed a life long aversion to military life.

After the war, Russell took up farming. Among his closest friends was Katharine Asquith, the widow of his old friend Raymond Asquith. In 1927, Russell took a lease of a farm on her family estate (Mells Manor, in Somerset) and there he remained for most of the remainder of his life. Having once unsuccessfully proposed marriage to Mrs Asquith, he subsequently devoted himself to purportedly chaste (if flirtatious) love affairs with Diana Cooper and Daphne Thynne, both of them married and rather younger than him.

== Character and letters ==
Lord Oxford provided the following assessment of Russell 40 years after his death:

“…a man of many contrasts: modest and diffident by temperament but clear-cut and forthright in his opinions; a quizzical observer and recorder of odd concrete facts but given to abstract speculation in matters of philosophy and religion; essentially kind but prone to astringency and even tartness in his comments; essentially truthful but a fascinating and shameless embroiderer of the truth; careful in money matters and somewhat absorbed in them, but extremely generous with all he had.”

Russell often exhibited a self-deprecating form of insouciance. On 3 April 1933 he wrote to Diana Cooper:

”…I am 55 today so my course is nearly run. It seems queer but I feel about 23 and very shy, callow and unformed – and quite without any knowledge of the world. I’ve learnt nothing and made a hash of my life. And instead of being humble and repentant I simply don’t care a button.”

A selection of Russell’s letters was published in 1987 by John Murray. Russell’s friend Evelyn Waugh (who appears in Russell’s letters as “Mr Wu”) described him as “one of the most exquisitely entertaining men I have known” and he gave full rein in his correspondence to his gift for (occasionally racy) drollery and gentle satire, combined on occasions with somewhat quizzical metaphysical speculation.

== Ancestry ==
Ancestors of Conrad Russell (letter writer)

John Russell
George Russell
Georgiana Byng
Arthur Russell
John Rawdon
Elizabeth Rawdon
Frances Hall-Stevenson
Conrad Russell
Paul Peyronnet
Laura Peyronnet
George Whitfield
Georgina Whitfield
Georgiana Ross
