= Nelke, Phillips & Bendix =

British stockbroking firm

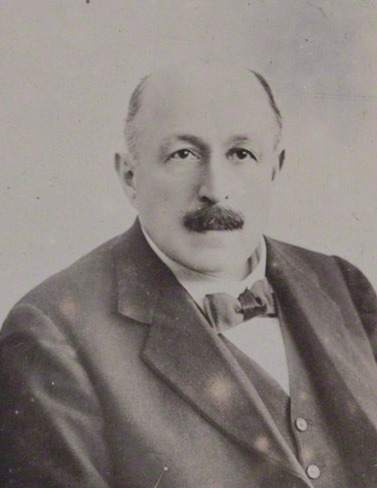
Paul Nelke

Nelke, Phillips & Bendix was an important stockbroking firm in the City of London from the 1890s through to the First World War.

Founded by Paul Solomon Nelke and Frederick Solomon Phillips, the firm dealt in mining shares and had clients like King Edward VII. The firm had offices in Throgmorton Avenue and Warnford Court, with Jack Churchill, Winston Churchill's brother, as a partner. During WWI, Paul Nelke was deemed an enemy alien, which led to the founding of stockbroking firm Vickers, da Costa in 1917 by former Nelke, Phillips partners and staff. Nelke converted Nelke, Phillips into a merchant bank, which continued until 1921. A new firm, Cull & Company, was founded in 1921 by Nelke's son-in-law and other partners. Cull & Co. was later sold to and absorbed by Morgan Grenfell in 1943.

== Origins ==
The firm's founders were Paul Solomon Nelke (1860-1925) and Frederick Solomon Phillips. Paul Nelke had been born in Berlin and had relocated to the City of London becoming a member of the London Stock Exchange. Phillips retired from the business in late 1907. At the time the partners were shown as Nelke, David Nunes da Costa, Joseph Ernest Rosen, John Richard Ryman, John Henry Millns and John Spencer-Churchill.

The firm became prominent dealers in the mining share market in the 1890s and dealt, at times, for King Edward VII.

The firm had its offices at Throgmorton Avenue and at Warnford Court in the City of London.

Jack Churchill, the brother of Winston Churchill was a partner of Nelke, Phillips. As a consequence, the investment activities of the future prime minister were channeled through the firm.

Hermann Marx (died 1947), a distant relative of Karl Marx joined Nelke, Phillips as a clerk at age 18 and became a partner at the age of 26.

== Fate ==
In March 1917, in the midst of World War I, a petition was raised by the Stock Exchange Anti-German Union, listing 142 members mainly of alien enemy birth, calling on the Committee for General Purposes not to re-elect them. As a result some fifty members, including prominent brokers such at Paul Nelke, Julius Stamm and Louis Fleischmann, were not reelected.

With Paul Nelke deemed to be an enemy alien, this precipitated the partners and staff of Nelke, Phillips to seek other ways of undertaking business.

== Ongoing ==
The important stockbroking firm of Vickers, da Costa was founded in 1917 by the former partners and staff of Nelke, Phillips, with the founding partners being Horace Vickers, Reggie Vickers, David Nunes da Costa and JH Millns. Jack Churchill became a partner of the new firm in 1921.

Despite Nelke's exclusion from the stockmarket, he converted Nelke, Phillips into a merchant bank and it continued as such until 1921. His daughter, Maude Julia Augusta Nelke married Gilbert Russell, the cousin of the Duke of Bedford, Herbrand Russell, 11th Duke of Bedford. Nelke had prospered in the post-war oil boom and decided to set up his son-in-law (who had been a London representative for Salomon Brothers) as a stockbroker. From this decision arose the firm of Cull & Company in 1921, with Russell, Hugh Micklem, Anders Eric Knös Cull (a Swede) and Hermann Marx as the founders. Micklem and Cull had both been successful oil share jobbers. This new firm had a close relationship with Calouste Gulbenkian. Ian Fleming was one of the firm's employees in the 1930s Other notable employees included the philosopher and former SOE and MI6 agent A. J. “Freddie” Ayer.

Eventually, Cull & Co. was sold to and absorbed by Morgan Grenfell in 1943.
