= Central Policy Review Staff =

The Central Policy Review Staff (CPRS), nicknamed the "Think-Tank", was an independent unit within the Cabinet Office of the United Kingdom tasked with developing long term strategy and co-ordinating policy across government departments. It was established by Edward Heath in February 1971 but was later disbanded by Margaret Thatcher following the 1983 general election.

The CPRS was created in response to The Reorganisation of Central Government white paper published in October 1970.

It had four directors over its 12-year lifetime; Lord Rothschild (1971–1974), Sir Kenneth Berrill (1974–1980), Sir Robin Ibbs (1980–1982) and John Sparrow (1982–1983).

Three of the Directors worked in the commercial sector; Rothschild was head of research at Shell, Ibbs was a director of Imperial Chemical Industries and Sparrow was a banker at Morgan Grenfell. Berrill had spent twenty years as an academic economist at Cambridge University before working for the Treasury.

The unit was always small, intentionally, never being more than 20 in number plus support staff. The average secondment was two years although a small number stayed longer. Its composition was a mix of academic, Whitehall civil servants and business (particularly the oil business, all from Shell or BP)

Three of the four Prime Ministers served by the CPRS felt it did a worthwhile job.

Edward Heath believed the CPRS was an important part of his government. "Their work was invariably thoroughly researched and well presented. I regard the CPRS as one of the best innovations of my years at No. 10. As a group which advised ministers collectively, it helped to maintain the cohesion of the government."

Harold Wilson had a positive view of the CPRS and he commented in his book The Governance of Britain "It was set up by our predecessors but we have found it very valuable and have continued it."

Equally James Callaghan thought well of the unit saying in his autobiography; "To my regret, and I believe to her loss, the unit was disbanded by Mrs Thatcher."

Margaret Thatcher had a rather different view of the CPRS by 1983. "The CPRS had originally been set up by Ted Heath as a source of long-term policy advice for the Government at a time when there were fewer private think-tanks, fewer special advisers in government and a widespread belief that the great questions of the day could be resolved by specialized technical analysis. But a government with a firm philosophical direction was inevitably a less comfortable environment for a body with a technocratic outlook."

Upon its abolition, some of the functions of the CPRS were transferred to the Downing Street policy unit.

== The Review of Overseas Representation ==
The most controversial report by the CPRS was The Review of Overseas Representation published in August 1977.

The concept of the review was initiated by the CPRS in late 1975 and was taken up by the Foreign Secretary, James Callaghan, who asked for the review to be extended to the BBC and the British Council. Callaghan also asked the CPRS to undertake the review. However, according to Joe Haines (Press Secretary to Prime Minister Harold Wilson) even before the proposals were shown to Callaghan the Foreign Office intervened: "the document he eventually saw, and approved, was modified – or doctored – on the way to his desk. The original proposals were not acceptable to senior F.C.O. officials, and the head of the C.P.R.S., Sir Kenneth Berrill, was asked to make deletions before it was put to the Secretary of State. That was agreed. The document placed before Jim Callaghan was not the original one."

The report was written by June 1977, shown to Ministers and published in August. There had been a mixed response from the Foreign Office during the review, the most notable and possibly most critical came from Sir Nicholas Henderson the Ambassador to France, although Anthony Parsons in Tehran was more supportive of the CPRS's work.

Its conclusions and recommendations were radical and on publication met with a barrage of criticism from supporters of the various organisations being reviewed. There was a debate in the House of Lords in November 1977 with contributions from members with connections to the British Council, the BBC as well as the Foreign Office. A House of Commons Select Committee also investigated the review and published their findings.

The orchestration of a critical campaign against the Review and the CPRS by the Foreign Office had started before its publication and is indicated by Bernard Donoughue in his diary entry for 7 February 1977: "Had lunch with The Economist journalist Richard Leonard – who told me that somebody from the FCO (Foreign and Commonwealth Office) had got the editor (Andrew Knight) of The Economist to 'doctor' an article so it was savagely critical of the (still unfinished!) CPRS report on the FCO. The machine is absolutely unprincipled in defending its interests."
