= Pierson Dixon =

British diplomat and writer

Sir Pierson Dixon GCMG CB
- Born: Pierson John Dixon; 13 November 1904
- Died: 22 April 1965 (aged 60)
- Education: Pembroke College, Cambridge
- Occupations: Diplomat and writer
- Spouse: Alexandra Ismene Atchley (m. 1928)
- Children: Piers Dixon (b. 1928); Jennifer Dixon; Corinna Dixon

Sir Pierson John Dixon GCMG CB (13 November 1904 – 22 April 1965) was a British diplomat and writer. He was known to be a firm believer in the value of diplomacy to solve international issues.

== Education ==
Dixon was educated at Bedford School and Pembroke College, Cambridge.

== Career ==
Dixon was the Principal Private Secretary to the Foreign Secretary from 1943 to 1948. He held the post of Ambassador to Czechoslovakia (1948–1950), and he was invested as Knight Commander of the Order of St. Michael and St. George in 1950. He later held the offices of Deputy Under-Secretary of State, Foreign Office (1950–1954) and Permanent Representative of the United Kingdom to the United Nations (1954–1960). He was involved during the Suez Crisis and the Hungarian Uprising in 1956. He was invested as a Knight Grand Cross, Order of St. Michael and St. George in 1957 and served as the ambassador to France from 1960 to 1964.

== Personal life ==
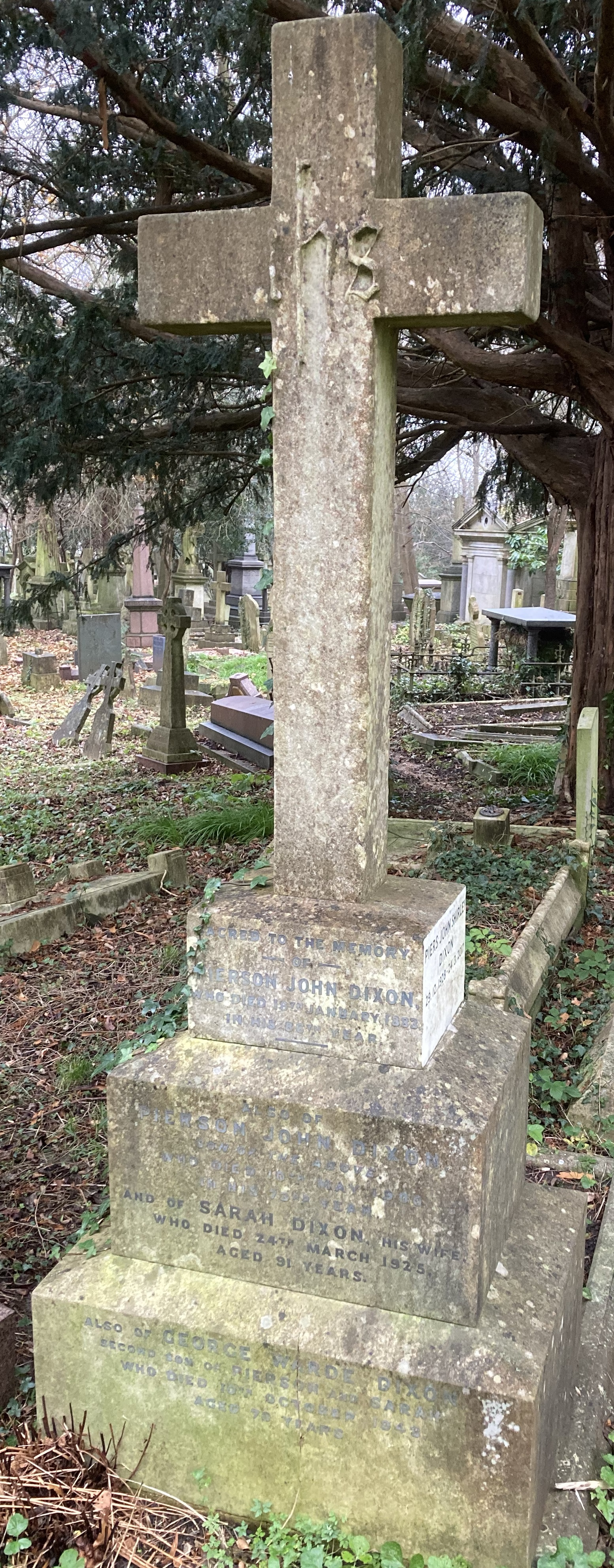
Family grave of Pierson John Dixon in Highgate Cemetery

In 1928 Dixon married Alexandra Ismene Atchley, with whom he had one son and two daughters:

- Piers John Shirley Dixon (1928−2017), Conservative politician and author of a biography of his father, Double Diploma: The Life of Sir Pierson Dixon
- Jennifer Nina Flora Mary Dixon, who married Peter Blaker, Baron Blaker
- Ann Anastasia Corinna Helena Dixon, who married James Hamilton, 4th Baron Hamilton of Dalzell

His ashes are buried in the Dixon family grave on the west side of Highgate Cemetery.

== Books ==
- The Iberians of Spain and their Relations with the Aegean World (1940) - history
- Farewell, Catullus (1953) - novel
- The Glittering Horn: Secret Memoirs of the Court of Justinian (1958) - novel
- Pauline: Napoleon's Favourite Sister (1964) - biography

Diplomatic posts
Preceded by Oliver, The Lord Harvey of Tasburgh	Principal Private Secretary to the Foreign Secretary; 1943-1947	Succeeded by Sir Frank Roberts
Preceded by Sir Gladwyn Jebb	British Ambassador to France; 1960-1965	Succeeded by Sir Patrick Reilly
