= Breakingviews =

- Website type: Financial journalism website
- Available in: English
- Owner: Thomson Reuters
- Creators: Hugo Dixon; Jonathan Ford
- Editor: Peter Thal Larsen
- Website: www.breakingviews.com
- Commercial: Yes
- Launched: 1999

Breakingviews is Reuters' brand for financial commentary. The company was founded in 1999 as Breakingviews.com and was acquired by Thomson Reuters in 2009.

== History ==
Breakingviews was founded in 1999 by Hugo Dixon, a former editor of the Financial Times' Lex column, and his colleague Jonathan Ford. It launched its website in July 2000. In 2001, the site became the first online business journal to win a Harold Wincott award, and its columnists have won several awards since then.

In 2005, the site launched a United States edition, led by founding editor Rob Cox. On January 1, 2007, the Wall Street Journal syndicated the service for a daily column on the back page of the "Money and Investing" section and WSJ.com. After Rupert Murdoch's News Corp bought Dow Jones, the parent of the Journal, the Breakingviews newspaper column moved to the New York Times and the International Herald Tribune (now the International New York Times), and to the Daily Telegraph in the U.K.

According to news reports at the time, Thomson Reuters bought the company in 2009 for $20 million.

Reuters announced in October 2012 that Dixon would step down as global editor-in-chief of Breakingviews, to be succeeded by Rob Cox.

Since 2022, the global editor-in-chief of Breakingviews has been Peter Thal Larsen.

== Partnerships ==
In addition to Breakingviews columns carried in major news publications around the world, they have appeared in Fortune magazine, Slate.com, Económico (Portugal), Le Monde (France), Handelsblatt (Germany), NRC Handelsblad (Netherlands), Caijing (China), The Business Times (Singapore), The National (United Arab Emirates), Kauppalehti (Finland), El Pais and Cinco Dias (Spain), l'Agefi (Switzerland), La Stampa (Italy), Business Standard (India) and other print and online outlets.
