= Vickers, da Costa =

Prominent stockbroking firm

- Company type: Partnership
- Industry: Investment Banking
- Founded: 1917; 109 years ago
- Founder: (Horace) Cecil Vickers
- Fate: Acquired by Citibank in 1986
- Successor: Citicorp Scrimgeour, Vickers
- Headquarters: London, United Kingdom
- Key people: John Clay, Kenneth Berrill
- Products: Investment Banking, Brokerage, Capital Markets
- Number of employees: over 700

Vickers, da Costa was a prominent stockbroking firm of the London Stock Exchange in the City of London, and later also of the New York Stock Exchange and the Tokyo Stock Exchange. Established as a successor of the German-Jewish owned firm of Nelke, Phillips & Bendix, which had been threatened with sequestration during the First World War due to its majority ownership by enemy nationals. To avoid this action a new company was nominally created by employees of the former firm, to assume its operations and clients. The firm was in business from 1917 until 1986, when after a takeover by Citicorp it was merged into a new firm called Scrimgeour Vickers. In 1987, its operations closed.

== History ==
The firm's founder was (Horace) Cecil Vickers (1882-1944), who had started work in the office of a Licensed Broker in 1895, shortly before his 13th birthday. He became a partner in the well-known stockbroking firm of Nelke, Phillips & Bendix of Throgmorton Street, which dealt for King Edward VII. The firm had been prominent in the mining share market in the 1890s.

In 1917, during the First World War, the Committee for General Purposes of the Stock Exchange received objections to the re-election of certain members 'of enemy origin', and Paul Nelke of Nelke, Phillips was deemed to be such a person. This precipitated the partners and staff of that firm to seek other ways of undertaking stockbroking business, and a new firm called Vickers, da Costa was founded by Horace Cecil Vickers, Reginald Vickers, David Nunes da Costa (descended from a prominent Hamburg Sephardi family) and JH Millns. The firm had its offices at 1, Throgmorton Street in the City of London. Jack Churchill, the brother of Winston Churchill, had also been a partner of Nelke, Phillips and thus he joined the new firm, being made a partner in 1921. As a consequence, the investment activities of the future prime minister were channeled through the firm. Nelke, Phillips did not come to an end, being converted into a merchant bank.

In 1938, the firm split when the Strauss brothers departed the partnership to form Strauss, Turnbull & Company (which would be bought by Societe Generale in 1986). As a result Vickers, da Costa was left with eight partners.

== Leadership ==
Ralph Cecil Vickers, born on 14 November 1913, the son of Horace Vickers, was on the staff of Vickers da Costa from 1935–39 and again from 1944 to 1981. He was Senior Partner, 1961-1972, and then Chairman until 1981. He led the firm during its period of prominence, growing it to having over 700 employees, with offices in London, Tokyo, Hong Kong, New York, Los Angeles, Luxembourg, Monte Carlo, and the Bahamas. It was said that 'the sun never set on Vickers, da Costa'. The firm was also a member of the New York Stock Exchange and the Tokyo Stock Exchange.

John Clay was the deputy chairman during the latter part of Ralph Vickers's term. He would later leave to found the New York-based asset manager, Clay Finlay. Sir Kenneth Berrill, the former head of the Think Tank, succeeded him as chairman in 1981.

For most of the post-war period its offices were at Regis House on King William Street. When the firm proposed this move in 1955, it needed the approval of the Stock Exchange to be "so far away" from the Exchange floor.

== Merger ==
In the mid-1980s on the eve of London's Big Bang deregulation of the London Stock Exchange, Citibank acquired stakes in the member firms of Scrimgeour Kemp-Gee and Vickers da Costa, merging them into a new entity called Scrimgeour Vickers. In the difficult trading environment in the wake of the Crash of 1987, Citicorp resolved to close the businesses and the names of the firms ceased to do business. Since 2001 the Vickers name has been retained in DBS Vickers, with its roots in Citicorp Vickers in Hong Kong and Jacob Ballas & Co. of Singapore.
