= Shirley Clifford Atchley =

British botanist, diplomat and translator (1871–1936)

Shirley Clifford Atchley CMG OBE
- Born: 14 January 1871; Bristol, Gloucestershire, England
- Died: 20 June 1936 (aged 65); Mount Kyllini, Greece
- Occupations: Diplomat and botanist
- Spouse: Anastasia Zersi Gerasi (m. 1893)
- Children: Alexandra Ismene Atchley; Virginia Athenais Atchley

Shirley Clifford Atchley CMG OBE (14 January 1871 – 20 June 1936) was a British diplomat and botanist.

== Career ==
Atchley was a translator with local rank of First Secretary in HM Diplomatic Service, HM Legation, Athens. He published on the life of Lord Byron in Greece and an account of the flora of Attica with the editorial assistance of W.B. Turrill.

== Bibliography ==
- Atchley, Shirley Clifford (1938). Wild Flowers of Attica. Oxford: Clarendon Press. OCLC 718341716.

- Dawkins, R. M. (1939). "Reviewed Work: Wild Flowers of Attica by S. C. Atchley". The Journal of Hellenic Studies. 59 (1): 182–183. doi:10.2307/626986. JSTOR 626986. S2CID 163655695.

- Atchley, Shirley Clifford (2000). Ο λόρδος Βύρων στην Ελλάδα [Ho Lordos Byrōn stēn Hellada (Life and Activities of Lord Byron in Greece)] (in Greek). Athēna: Bagionakēs. ISBN 9789607940056.

== Honours ==
- 1924 Birthday Honours: Officer of the Order of the British Empire (OBE), Local First Secretary at His Majesty's Legation at Athens
- 1930 Companion of the Order of St Michael and St George (CMG) Translator at His Majesty's Legation at Athens

== Personal life ==
Atchley married Anastasia Zersi Gerasi in 1893, they had two daughters Alexandra Ismene Atchley and Virginia Athenais Atchley. Alexandra married the diplomat Pierson Dixon, and Virginia also married a diplomat, Claud Russell.

Atchley died while climbing Mount Kyllini, Greece. Although an experienced mountaineer he had been suffering from heart problems, this with the height of the mountain was the apparent cause.
