= Lord George Russell =

British soldier, politician and diplomat (1790–1846)

Major-General Lord George Russell GCB

British Minister to Prussia
- In office 1835–1841
- Preceded by: Sir George Shee, Bt
- Succeeded by: Lord Burghersh

British Minister to Württemberg
- In office 1833–1835 Serving with Sir George Shee, Bt
- Preceded by: Edward Cromwell Disbrowe

Member of Parliament for Bedford
- In office 1812–1830 Serving with Samuel Whitbread, Hon. William Waldegrave, William Henry Whitbread
- Preceded by: Samuel Whitbread; William Lee-Antonie
- Succeeded by: William Henry Whitbread; Frederick Polhill

Personal details
- Born: 8 May 1790
- Died: 16 July 1846 (aged 56) Genoa, Kingdom of Sardinia
- Spouse: Elizabeth Anne Rawdon (m. 1817; died 1846)
- Relations: John Russell, 1st Earl Russell (brother)
- Children: 4, including Francis, Arthur, and Odo
- Parent: John Russell, 6th Duke of Bedford

Major-General Lord George William Russell (8 May 1790 – 16 July 1846) was a British Army officer, Whig politician and diplomat. He served as Member of Parliament for Bedford from 1812 to 1830 and later held diplomatic posts in Lisbon, Württemberg and Prussia. He was the second son of John Russell, 6th Duke of Bedford, and the elder brother of Prime Minister John Russell, 1st Earl Russell.

== Early life ==
Russell was born on 8 May 1790. He was the second son of the John Russell, 6th Duke of Bedford by his first wife, Hon. Georgiana Byng, daughter of George Byng, 4th Viscount Torrington. Among his siblings were John Russell, the Whig and Liberal Prime Minister.

He was educated by Dr. Moore at Sunbury, at Westminster School, and by the Rev. John Smith at Woodnesborough.

== Career ==
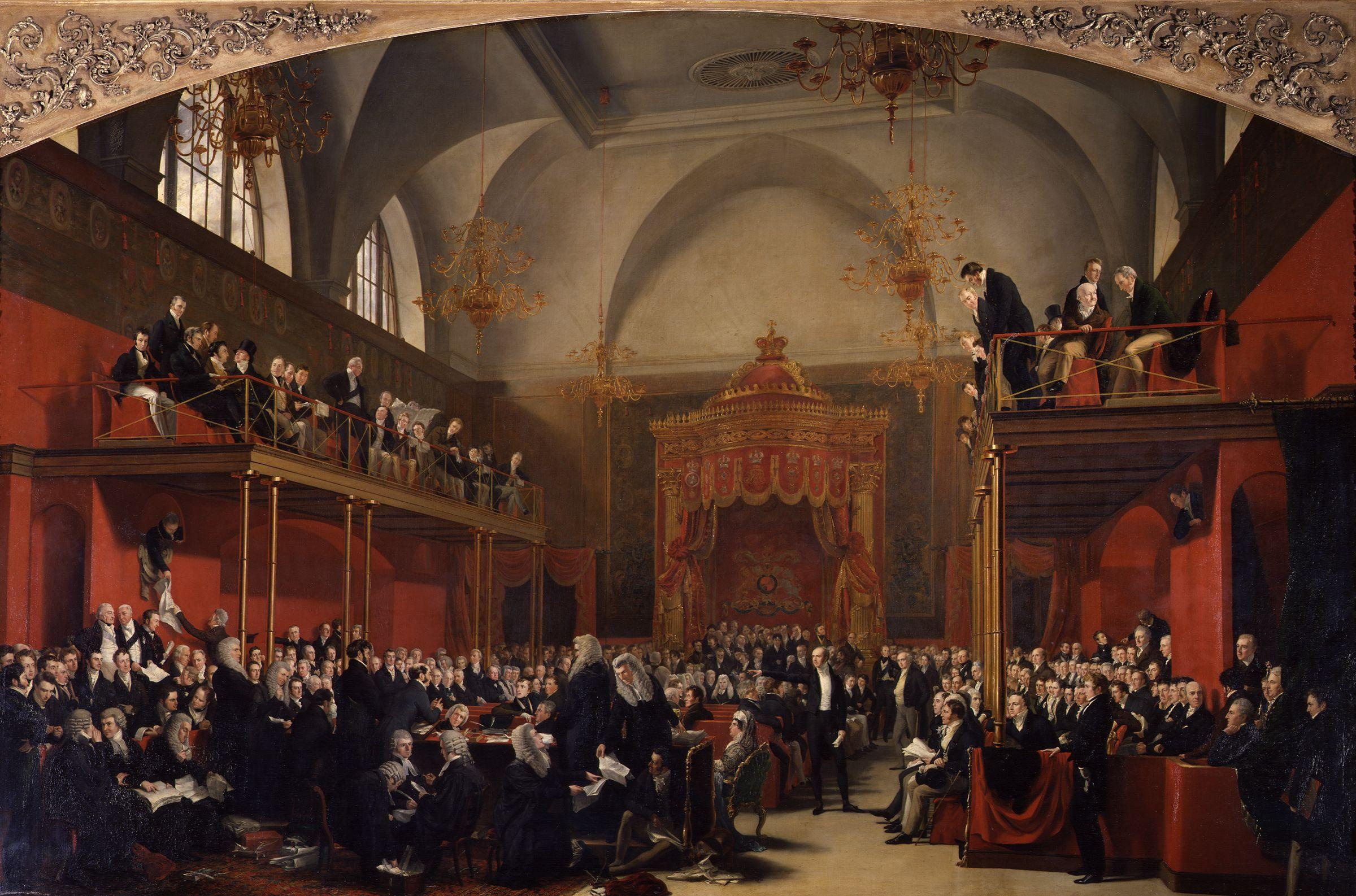
The Trial of Queen Caroline 1820 by Sir George Hayter

Upon gaining the rank of lieutenant in the 1st Dragoon Guards, Russell was appointed aide-de-camp (ADC) to Sir George Ludlow on his Copenhagen Expedition in 1807. During the Peninsular War he fought in the Battle of Talavera on 27 July 1809 where he was wounded. He was then ADC to General Thomas Graham in 1810 and fought at the Battle of Barossa in 1811. He was ADC to Viscount Wellington (later the Duke of Wellington) in 1812 and again in 1817, when the Duke was Ambassador in Paris.

As the brother of Prime Minister of the United Kingdom Lord John Russell, he sat as Member of Parliament for Bedford from 1812 until 1830. He was invested as a Companion, Order of the Bath (CB) in 1831. He held the office of Minister to Lisbon in August 1833, the office of Minister to Württemberg in November 1833 and the office of Ambassador to Berlin in 1835. He was invested as a Knight Grand Cross, Order of the Bath (GCB) in 1838 and gained the rank of major-general in November 1841.

== Personal life ==
On 21 June 1817, Russell married Elizabeth Anne Rawdon (1793–1874), the daughter of Frances (née Hall-Stevenson) and Capt. the Hon. John Theophilus Rawdon of Bolney Court, the brother of Francis Rawdon-Hastings, 1st Marquess of Hastings. Her paternal grandparents were John Rawdon, 1st Earl of Moira and Elizabeth Rawdon, Countess of Moira. The couple were the parents of:

- Blanche Russell (1818–1818), who died young.
- Francis Charles Hastings Russell, 9th Duke of Bedford (1819–1891), who married Lady Elizabeth Sackville-West, daughter of George Sackville-West, 5th Earl De La Warr and Elizabeth Sackville, 1st Baroness Buckhurst, in 1844.
- Lord Arthur John Edward Russell (1825–1892), the Whig and Liberal MP for Tavistock who married Laura de Peyronnet, daughter of Paul Louis Jules, Vicomte de Peyronnet, and Georgina Frances Whitfield, in 1865.
- Odo William Leopold Russell, 1st Baron Ampthill (1829–1884), the British diplomat and first British Ambassador to the German Empire who married Lady Emily Theresa Villiers, daughter of George Villiers, 4th Earl of Clarendon and Lady Katherine Grimston (daughter of the 1st Earl of Verulam), on 5 May 1868.

Lord George died in Genoa on 16 July 1846.

== Bibliography ==
- Lloyd, E. M. & Seccombe, T. "Russell, Lord George William (1790–1846)", rev. James Falkner, Oxford Dictionary of National Biography, Oxford University Press, 2004 , (Retrieved 28 Feb 2006) (subscription required)

Parliament of the United Kingdom
Preceded by Samuel Whitbread; William Lee-Antonie	Member of Parliament for Bedford; 1812–1830; With: Samuel Whitbread 1812–1815, Hon. William Waldegrave 1815–1818, William Henry Whitbread 1818–1830	Succeeded by William Henry Whitbread; Frederick Polhill
Diplomatic posts
Preceded by Edward Cromwell Disbrowe	British Minister to Württemberg; 1833–1835	Succeeded by Sir George Shee, Bt
Preceded by Sir George Shee, Bt	British Minister to Prussia; 1835–1841	Succeeded by Lord Burghersh
