= Elizabeth, Lady William Russell =

English socialite

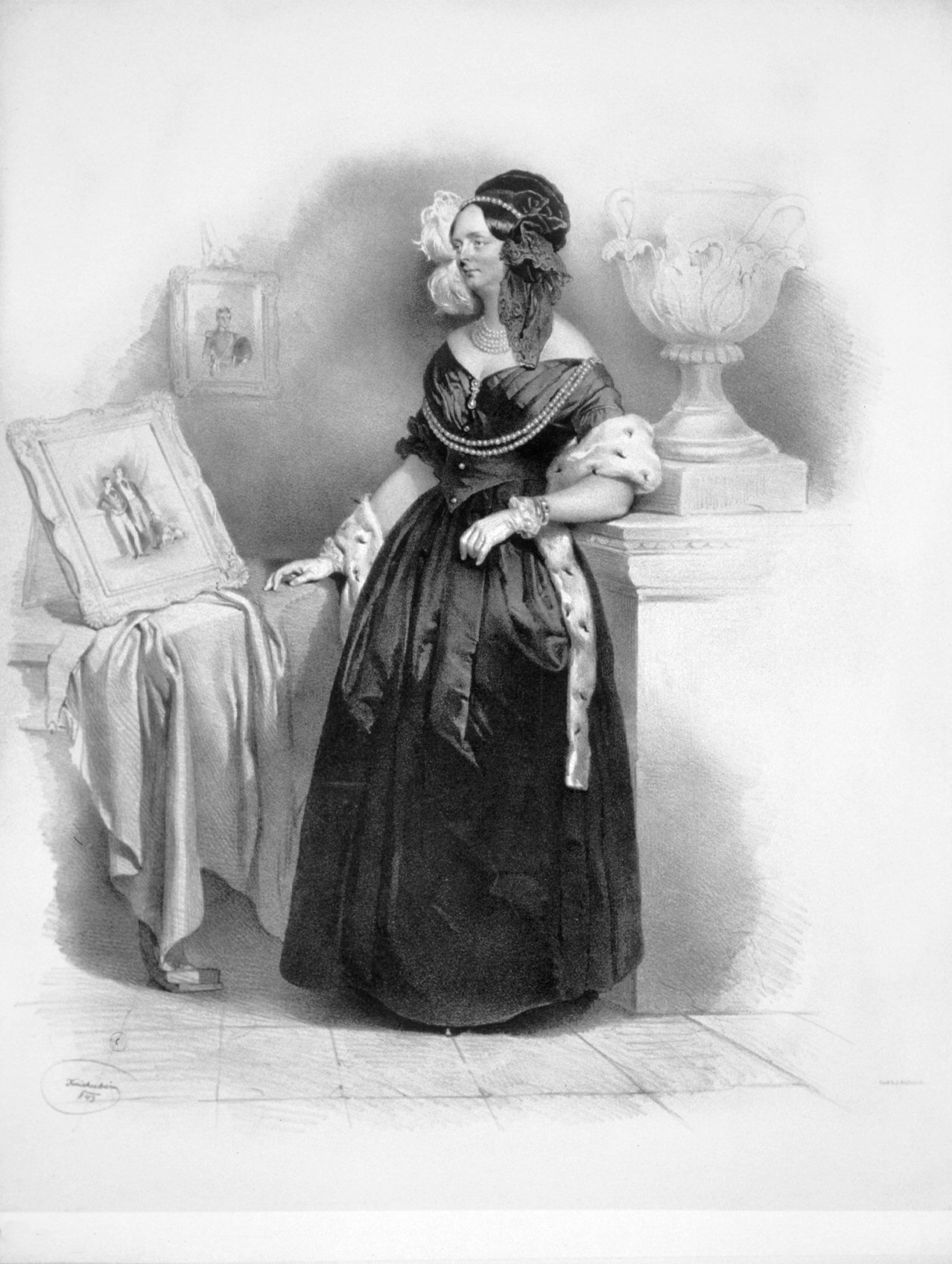
- Elizabeth Anne, Lady William Russell 1843
- Born: Elizabeth Anne Theophila Rawdon; 2 October 1793; London, England
- Died: 10 August 1874 (aged 80); London, England
- Resting place: Chenies, Buckinghamshire
- Spouse: Lord George William Russell
- Children: Francis Russell, Duke of Bedford; Lord Arthur John Edward Russell; Odo Russell, Baron Ampthill
- Relatives: John Theophilus Rawdon (father); Francis Rawdon-Hastings, 1st Marquess of Hastings (uncle); George Rawdon (uncle)

Elizabeth Anne, Lady William Russell (2 October 1793 – 10 August 1874) was the socialite wife of Lord George William Russell.

== Early life ==
Elizabeth Anne Theophila Rawdon was born on 2 October 1793, child of Frances (née Hall-Stevenson) and Captain the Hon. John Theophilus Rawdon (died 1808), the brother of Francis Rawdon-Hastings, 1st Marquess of Hastings.

She was baptised at St Mary, Staines, Middlesex, on 4 October 1793. She spent much of her childhood in Europe, particularly Vienna and 'received an education more suited to a boy than a girl' at that time, including a deep knowledge of French, German, Spanish, and Italian, Greek and Latin as well as botany, astronomy and classical literature.

== Adult life ==
Elizabeth Anne Rawdon married Lord George William Russell on 21 June 1817. A beautiful and energetic cosmopolitan who had enjoyed a broad European education, Lord Byron praised her in Beppo as "[one] whose bloom could, after dancing, dare the dawn". Her outspoken Tory sympathies won her few friends among her husband's Liberal circle. Henry Brougham, 1st Baron Brougham and Vaux described her as '"that accursed woman'".

She and Russell had three sons, all of whom she tutored at home, perhaps lending them a rather distinctive approach to life:

- Francis Russell, 9th Duke of Bedford;
- Lord Arthur John Edward Russell;
- Odo Russell, 1st Baron Ampthill.

Benjamin Disraeli said in conversation "I think she is the most fortunate woman in England, for she has the three nicest sons".

She died on 10 August 1874.

== Commemoration ==
A biography of Elizabeth, Lady William Russell was published by the Oxford Dictionary of National Biography in December 2020.

== Bibliography ==
- LLoyd, E. M.; Seccombe, Thomas. "Russell, Lord George William (1790–1846)". Oxford Dictionary of National Biography (online ed.). Oxford University Press. doi:10.1093/ref:odnb/24310. (Subscription, Wikipedia Library access or UK public library membership required.)
