= Winston Churchill as a writer =

Literary career of the British statesman

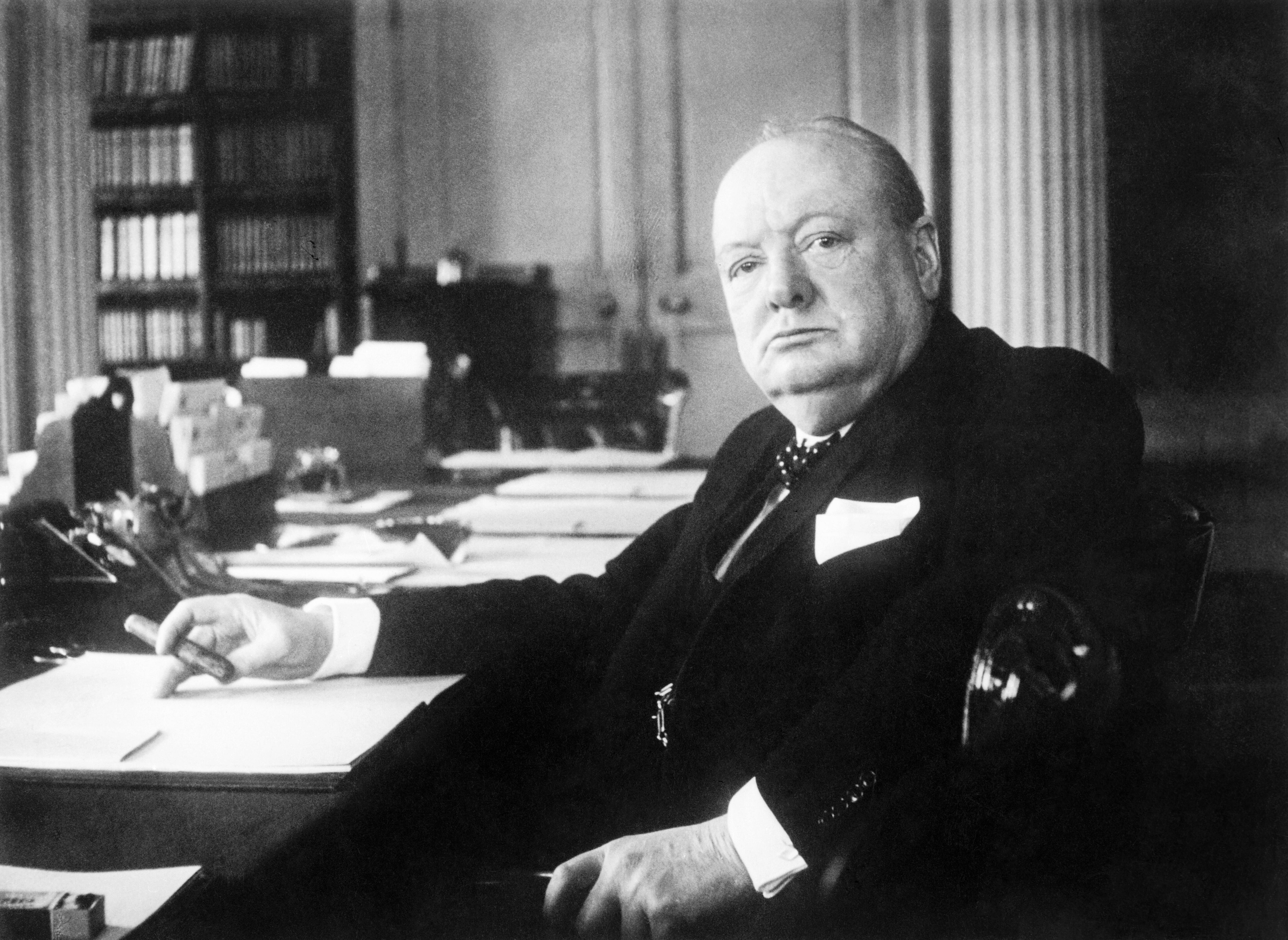
Churchill at his desk in 1940

Winston Churchill, in addition to his careers as a military officer and politician, was a prolific writer under the variant of his full name "Winston S. Churchill". After being commissioned into the 4th Queen's Own Hussars in 1895, Churchill gained permission to observe the Cuban War of Independence and sent war reports to The Daily Graphic. He continued his war journalism in British India, at the Siege of Malakand, then in the Sudan during the Mahdist War and in southern Africa during the Second Boer War.

Churchill's fictional output included one novel, a short story, and a work of alternate history; but his main output comprised non-fiction. After he was elected as an MP, over 130 of his speeches or parliamentary answers were also published in pamphlets or booklets; many were subsequently published in collected editions. Churchill received the Nobel Prize in Literature in 1953 "for his mastery of historical and biographical description as well as for brilliant oratory in defending exalted human values".

== Writing career ==
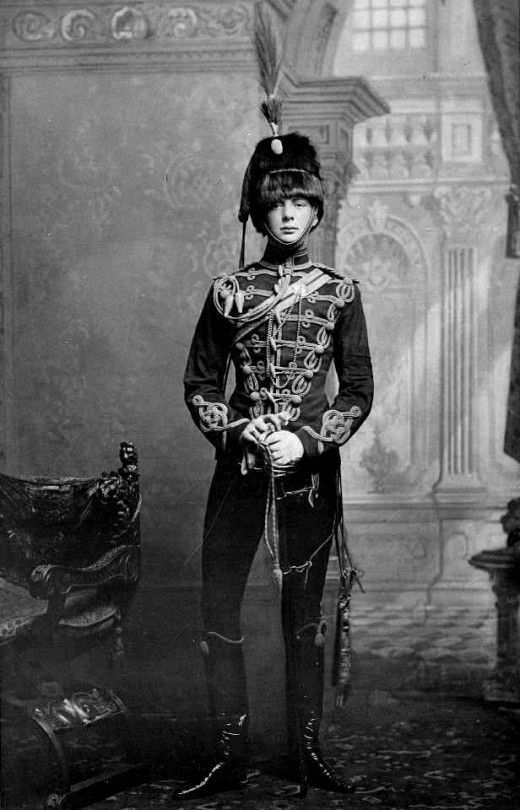
Churchill, age 21, as a cornet in the 4th Queen's Own Hussars in 1895

In 1895 Winston Churchill was commissioned cornet (second lieutenant) into the 4th Queen's Own Hussars. His annual pay was £300, and he calculated he needed an additional £500 to support a style of life equal to that of other officers of the regiment. (Note: £300 in 1895 equates to £34,105 in 2025; £500 in 1895 equates to £56,842 in 2025.) To earn the required funds, he gained his colonel's agreement to observe the Cuban War of Independence; his mother, Lady Randolph Churchill, used her influence to secure a contract for her son to send war reports to The Daily Graphic. He was subsequently posted back to his regiment, then based in British India, where he took part in, and reported on the Siege of Malakand; the reports were published in The Pioneer and The Daily Telegraph. The reports formed the basis of his first book, The Story of the Malakand Field Force, which was published in 1898. To relax he also wrote his only novel, Savrola, which was also published in 1898. That same year he was transferred to Sudan to take part in the Mahdist War (1881–1899), where he participated in the Battle of Omdurman in September 1898. He published his recollections in The River War (1899).

In 1899 Churchill resigned his commission and travelled to South Africa as the correspondent with The Morning Post, on a salary of £250 a month plus all expenses, to report on the Second Boer War. (Note: £250 in 1899 equates to £27,775 in 2025.) He was captured by the Boers in November of that year, but managed to escape. He remained in the country and continued to send in his reports to the newspaper. He subsequently published his despatches in two works, London to Ladysmith via Pretoria and Ian Hamilton's March (both 1900). He returned to Britain in 1900 and was elected as the Member of parliament for the Oldham constituency at that year's general election.

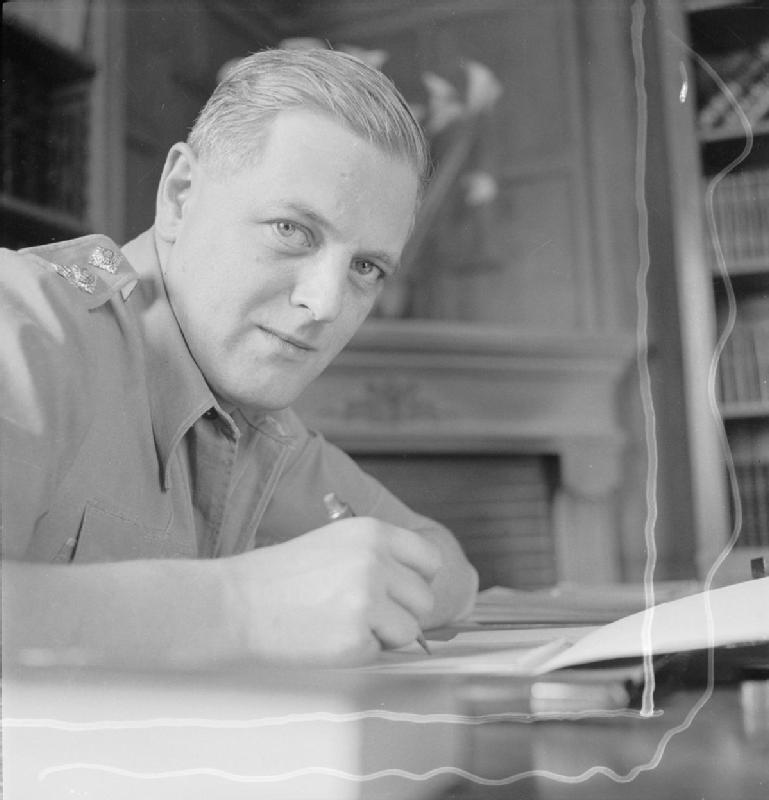
Randolph Churchill, Winston's son, who edited the published collections of his father's speeches; photographed by Cecil Beaton during the Second World War.

As a serving MP he began publishing pamphlets containing his speeches or answers to key parliamentary questions. Beginning with Mr Winston Churchill on the Education Bill (1902), over 135 such tracts were published over his career. Many of these were subsequently compiled into collections, several of which were edited by his son, Randolph and others of which were edited by Charles Eade, the editor of the Sunday Dispatch. In addition to his parliamentary duties, Churchill wrote a two-volume biography of his father, Lord Randolph Churchill, published in 1906, in which he "presented his father as a tory with increasingly radical sympathies", according to the historian Paul Addison.

In the 1922 general election Churchill lost his parliamentary seat and moved to the south of France where he wrote The World Crisis, a six-volume history of the First World War, published between 1923 and 1931. The book was well-received, although the former Prime Minister Arthur Balfour dismissed the work as "Winston's brilliant autobiography, disguised as world history". At the 1924 general election Churchill returned to the Commons. In 1930 he wrote his first autobiography, My Early Life, after which he began his research for Marlborough: His Life and Times (1933–1938), a four-volume biography of his ancestor, John Churchill, 1st Duke of Marlborough. Before the final volume was published, Churchill wrote a series of biographical profiles for newspapers, which were later collected together and published as Great Contemporaries (1937).

In May 1940, eight months after the outbreak of the Second World War, Churchill became prime minister. He wrote no histories during his tenure, although several collections of his speeches were published. At the end of the war he was voted out of office at the 1945 election; he returned to writing and, with a research team headed by the historian William Deakin, produced a six-volume history, The Second World War (1948–1953). The books became best-sellers in both the UK and US. Churchill served as prime minister for a second time between October 1951 and April 1955 before resigning the premiership; he continued to serve as an MP until 1964. His final major work was the four-volume work A History of the English-Speaking Peoples (1956–1958). In 1953, Churchill was awarded the Nobel Prize in Literature "for his mastery of historical and biographical description as well as for his brilliant oratory in defending exalted human values". Churchill was almost always well paid as an author and, for most of his life, writing was his main source of income. He produced a huge portfolio of written work; the journalist and historian Paul Johnson estimates that Churchill wrote an estimated eight to ten million words in more than forty books, thousands of newspaper and magazine articles, and at least two film scripts. John Gunther in 1939 estimated that he earned $100,000 a year ($1.76 million in 2024) from writing and lecturing, but that "of this he spends plenty".

When demand was high for his newspaper and magazine articles, Churchill employed a ghostwriter. During 1934, for example, Churchill was commissioned by Collier's, the News of the World, the Daily Mail—and, added that year, the Sunday Dispatch, for which the newspaper's editor, William Blackwood, employed Adam Marshall Diston to rework Churchill's old material (Churchill himself would write one new piece in every four published by the Dispatch). Later in the year, when Churchill had less time to write, at the recommendation of Blackwood he employed Diston directly as his ghostwriter. Diston wrote, for example, Churchill's remaining Collier's articles for the year, being paid £15 from the £350 commission Churchill received for each article. Blackwood considered Diston a 'splendid journalist' and his first article written for Churchill went to print without change—this, according to David Lough, "was the start of a partnership that would flourish for the rest of the decade". By the end of the following year, Diston had already prepared most of Churchill's 'The Great Men I Have Known' series for the News of the World in Britain and Collier's in the US, due to appear from January 1936. Sir Emsley Carr, the British newspaper's chairman, enjoyed them so much he immediately signed up Churchill for a series in 1937. The News of the World would pay nearly £400 (£12,000 today) an article. Another of Churchill's ghostwriters was his Private Secretary Edward Marsh (who would at times receive up to 10 per cent of Churchill's commission).

=== American novelist of the same name ===
In the late 1890s Churchill's writings first came to be confused with those of his American contemporary Winston Churchill, a best-selling novelist. He wrote to his American counterpart about the confusion their names were causing among their readers, offering to sign his own works "Winston Spencer Churchill", adding the first half of his double-barrelled surname, Spencer-Churchill, which he did not otherwise use. After a few early editions his pen name appeared as "Winston S. Churchill".

The two men met on occasions when one of them happened to be in the other's country, but their diametrically opposed personalities prevented the development of a close friendship.

== Bibliography ==
=== Non-fiction ===
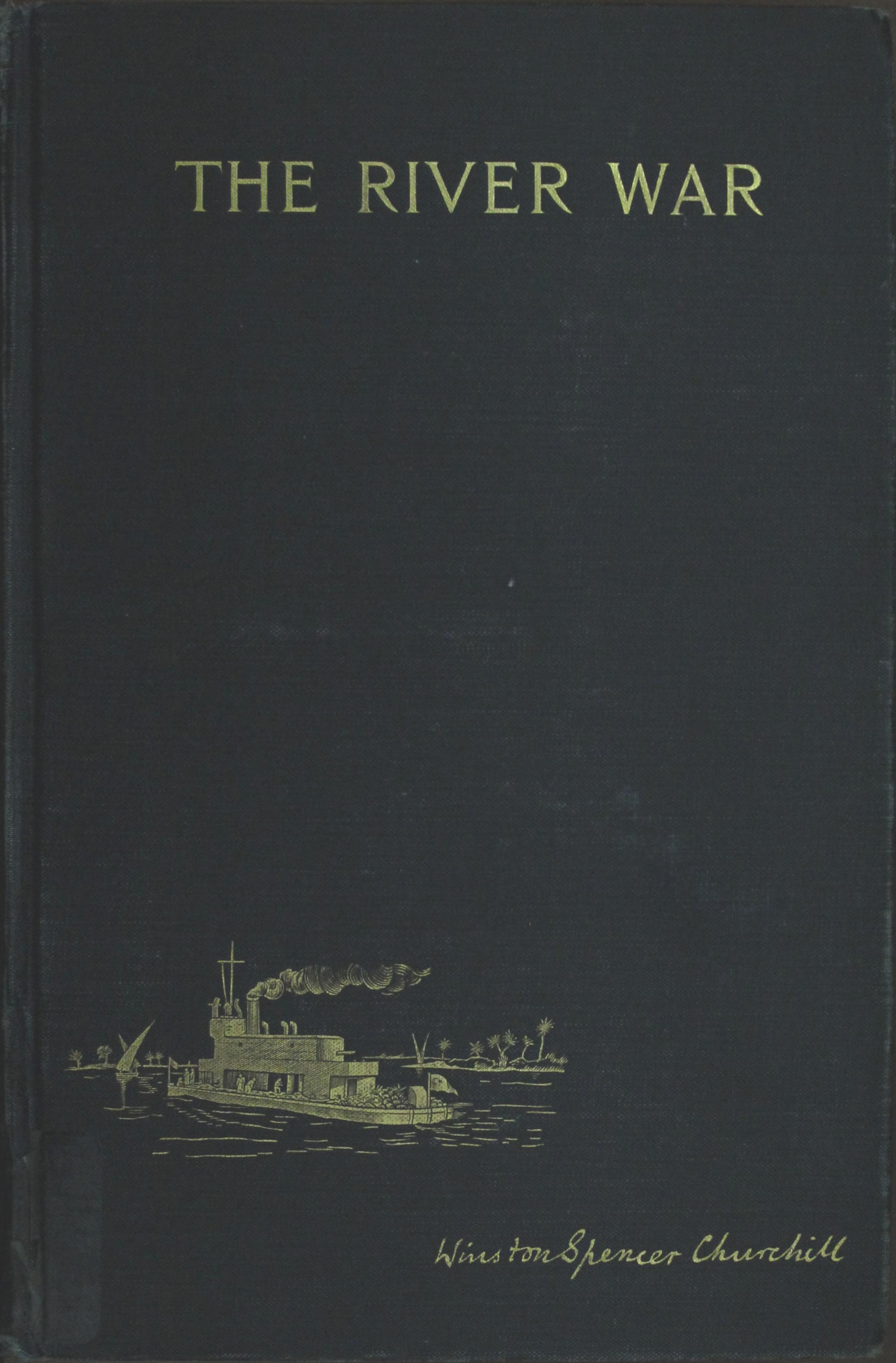
Cover of The River War, 1899, showing the original form of his pen name

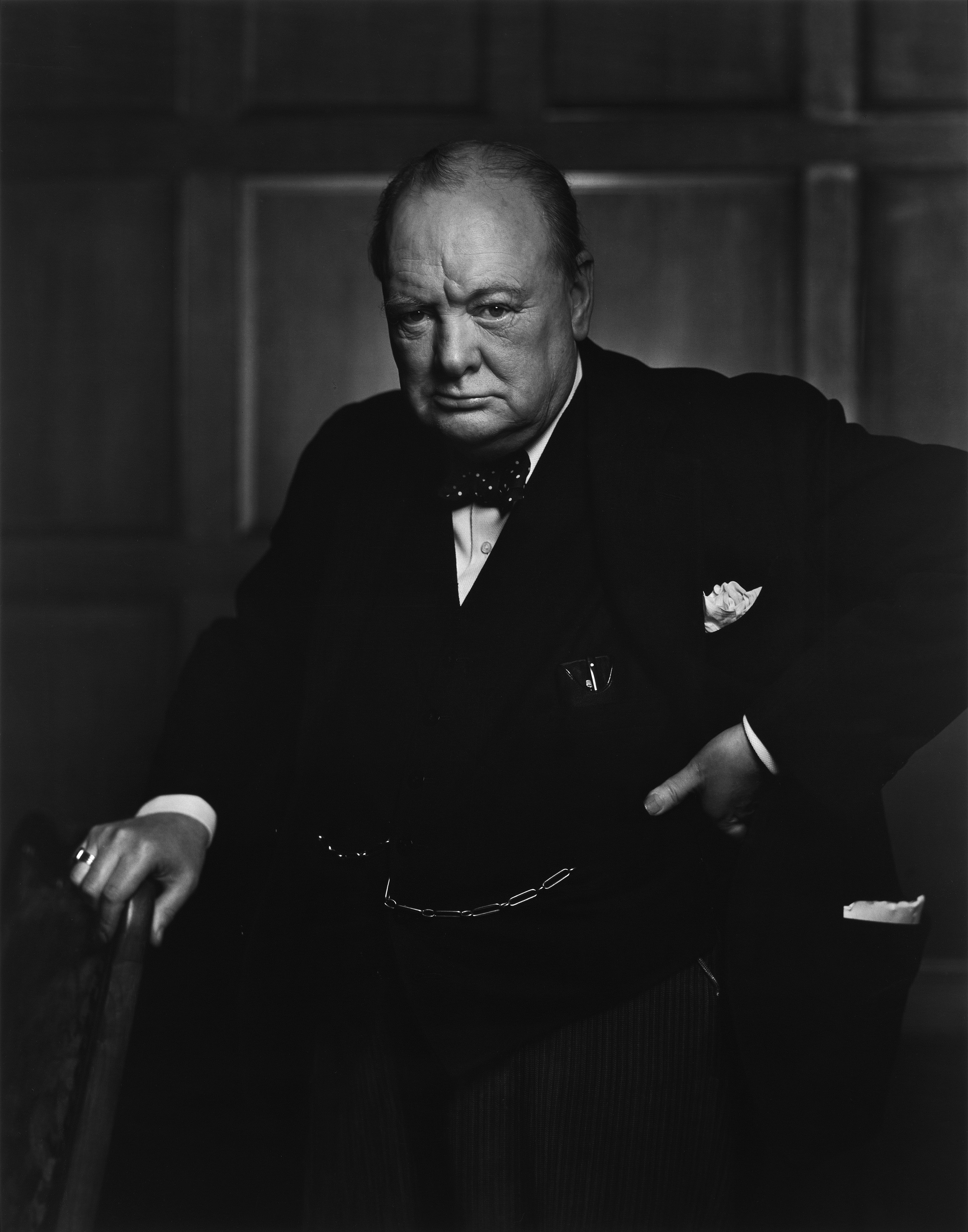
Churchill in Canada in December 1941

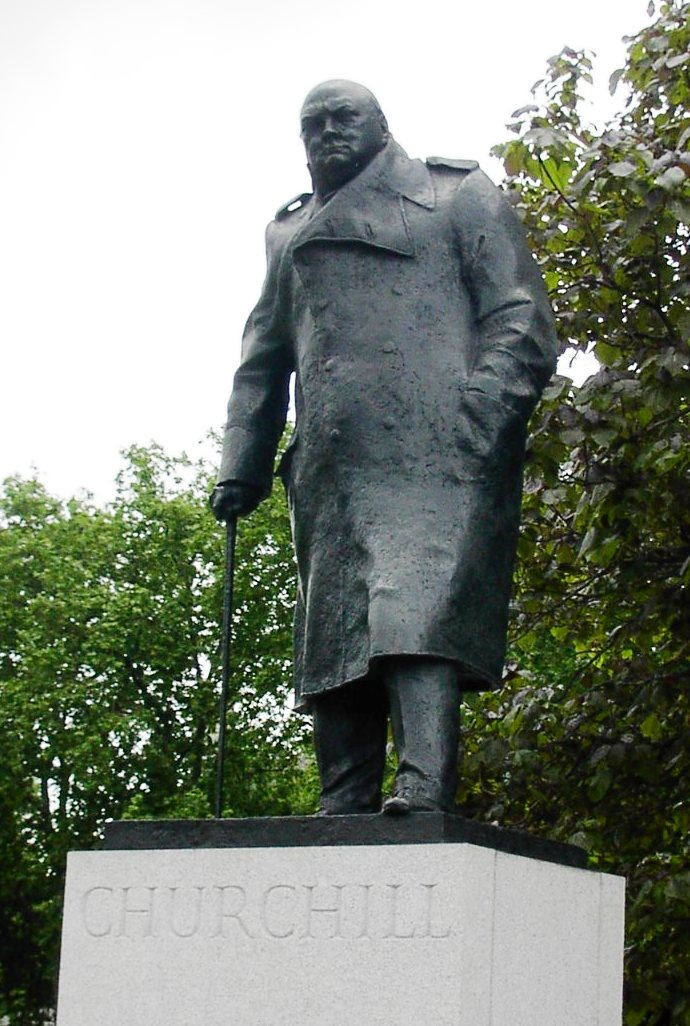
Statue of Winston Churchill in Parliament Square, London

The non-fiction work of Churchill
Title	Year of first publication	First edition publisher	Notes
The Story of the Malakand Field Force	1898	Longman, London	
The River War	1899	Longman, London	Edited by Colonel Francis Rhodes; two volumes; reissued in 1901 as a single work
London to Ladysmith via Pretoria	1900	Longman, London & New York	
Ian Hamilton's March	1900	Longman, London & New York	
Lord Randolph Churchill	1906	Macmillan Publishers, London	Two volumes
My African Journey	1908	Hodder & Stoughton, London	
The World Crisis	1923–1931	Butterworth, London	Six volumes; abridged and revised into one volume in 1931: 1. 1911–1914 (1923); 2. 1915 (1923); 3. 1916–1918 (Part 1) (1927); 4. 1916–1918 (Part 2) (1927); 5. The Aftermath (1929); 6. The Eastern Front (1931)
Shall We All Commit Suicide?	1924	The Pall Mall Magazine	Essay
My Early Life	1930	Butterworth, London	Published in the US as A Roving Commission: My Early Life
Thoughts and Adventures	1932	Butterworth, London	Published in the US as Amid These Storms
Marlborough: His Life and Times	1933–1938	Butterworth, London	Four volumes
Great Contemporaries	1937	Butterworth, London	Revised and enlarged edition published in 1938
The Second World War	1948–1953	Cassell, London	Six volumes, consisting of: 1. The Gathering Storm (1948); 2. Their Finest Hour (1949); 3. The Grand Alliance (1950); 4. The Hinge of Fate (1950); 5. Closing the Ring (1951); 6. Triumph and Tragedy (1953)
Painting as a Pastime	1948	Odhams Press, London	
A History of the English-Speaking Peoples	1956–1958	Cassell, London	Four volumes, consisting of: 1. The Birth of Britain (1956); 2. The New World (1956); 3. The Age of Revolution (1957); 4. The Great Democracies (1958)

=== Fiction ===
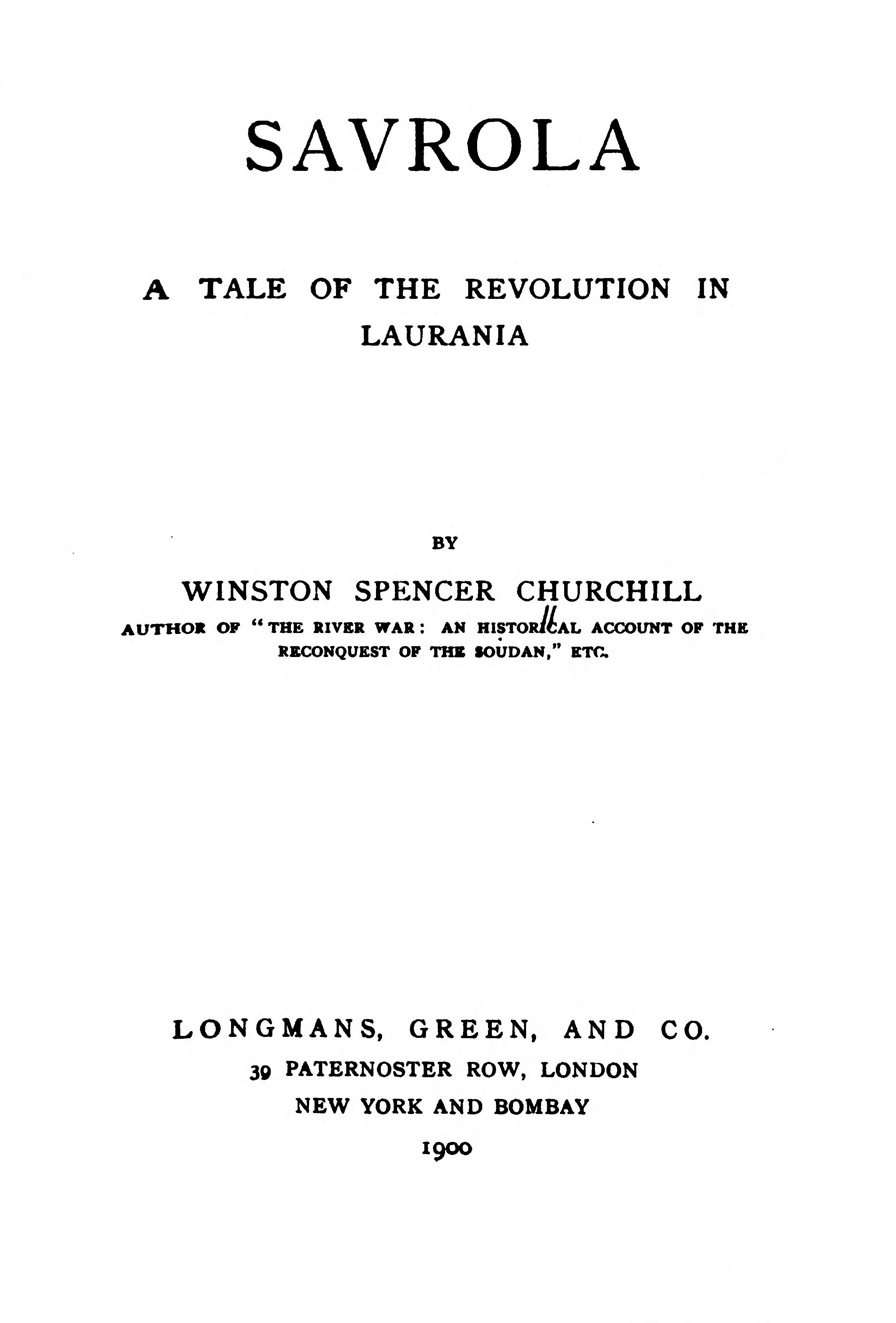
Title page of the 1900 edition of Savrola

Churchill's fictional work
Title	Year of first publication	First edition publisher	Notes
"Man Overboard; an Episode of the Red Sea"	1898	Harmsworth Brothers, London	Written in youth. First published work of fiction. Appeared in The Harmsworth Magazine issue of December 1898.
Savrola	1900	Longman, London	Novel; first appeared in serial form in Macmillan's Magazine 1898–1900
"If Lee Had NOT Won the Battle of Gettysburg" in If It Had Happened Otherwise	1931	Sidgwick and Jackson, London	With others
"The Dream"	1966	Daily Telegraph	Short story; first written in 1947 and first published as a feature in The Sunday Telegraph in January 1966, then as part of The Collected Essays in 1976. "The Dream" was not published in book form until September 1987, four decades after it was written and more than two decades after Churchill's death.

=== Collected speeches ===
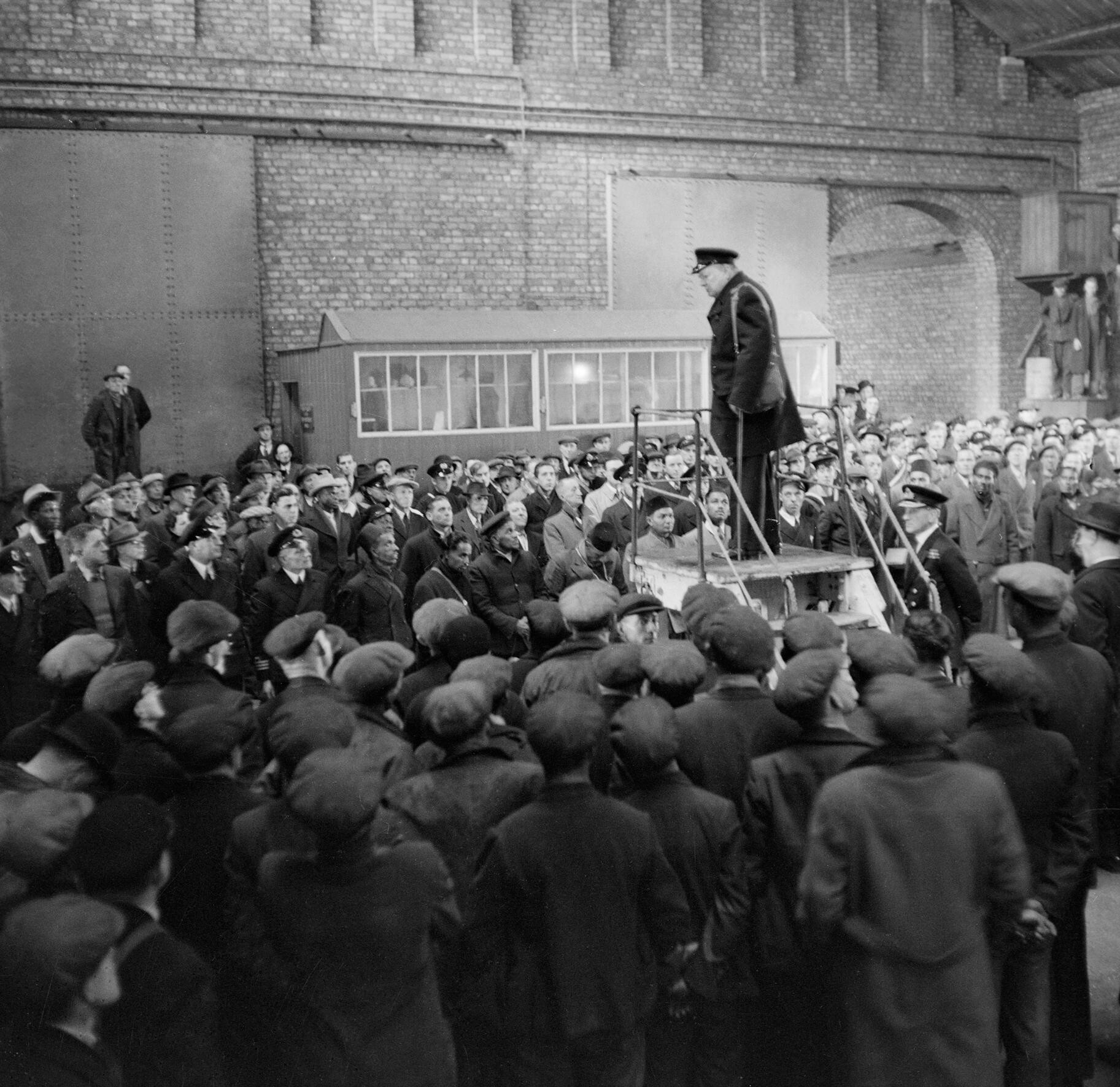
Churchill addressing merchant ships' crews and dockers at Liverpool, April 1941

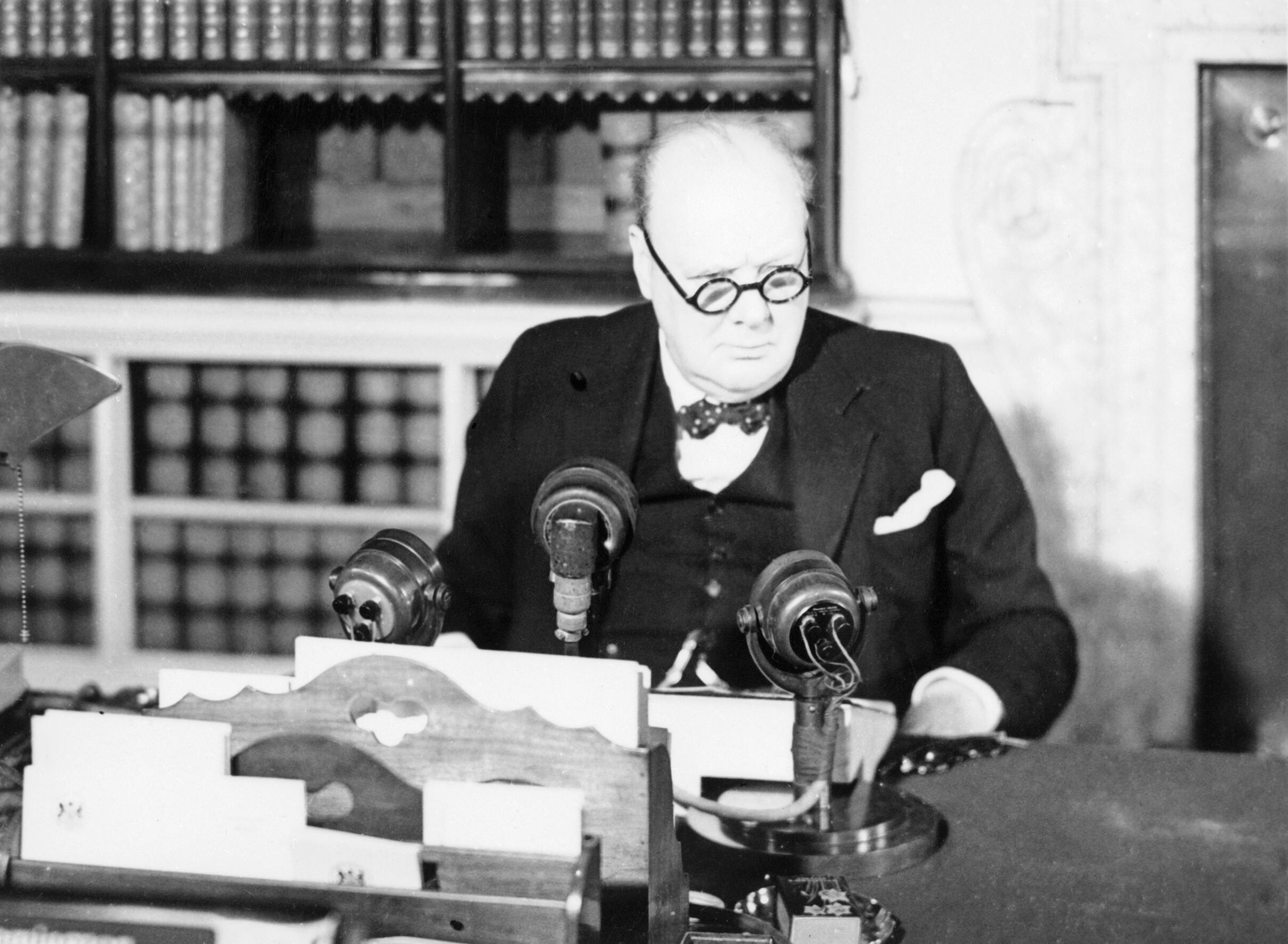
Churchill at a BBC microphone about to broadcast to the nation on the afternoon of VE Day, 8 May 1945.

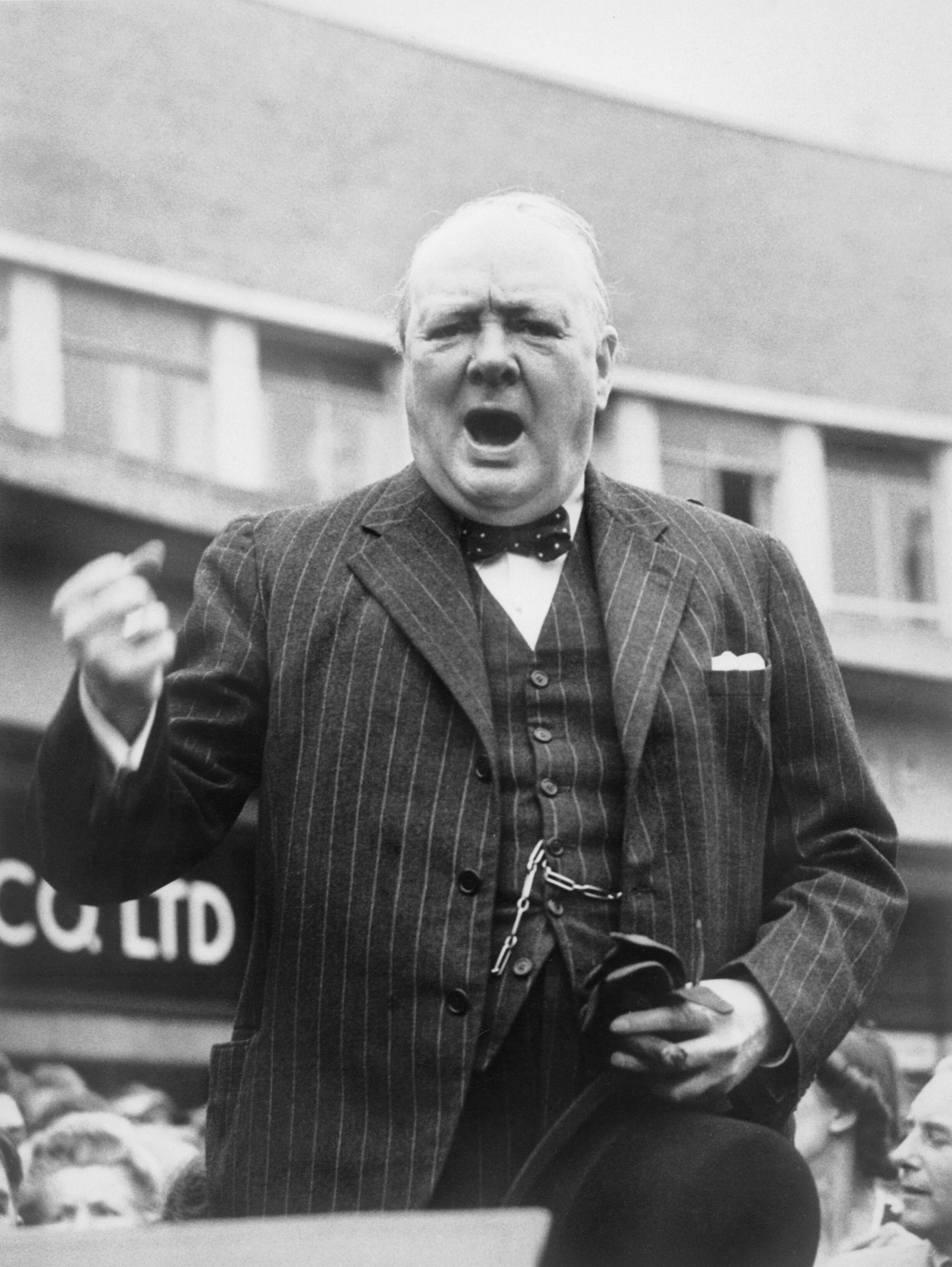
Churchill during the 1945 General Election

There are around 135 published booklets of Churchill's individual speeches, including "Mr Winston Churchill on the Education Bill" (1902), "The Fiscal Puzzle: Both Sides Explained by Leading Men'" (1903), "Why I am a Free Trader" (1905) and "Prisons and Prisoners" (1910); the following are speeches published in a collected form.

Collected books of Churchill's speeches
Title	Year of first publication	First edition publisher	Notes
Mr Brodrick's Army	1903	Humphreys, London	
For Free Trade	1906	Humphreys, London	
Liberalism and the Social Problem	1909	Hodder & Stoughton, London	
The People's Rights	1910	Hodder & Stoughton, London	
Parliamentary Government and the Economic Problem	1930	The Clarendon Press, Oxford	
India: Speeches and an Introduction	1931	Butterworth, London	
Arms and the Covenant	1938	George G. Harrap and Co., London	Edited by Randolph Churchill; published in the US as While England Slept
Step by Step: 1936–1939	1939	Butterworth, London	Edited by Randolph Churchill
Addresses Delivered	1940	Ransohoffs, San Francisco	
Into Battle	1941	Butterworth, London	Edited by Randolph Churchill; published in the US as Blood, Sweat and Tears
Broadcast Addresses	1941	Ransohoffs, San Francisco	
The Unrelenting Struggle	1942	Cassell, London	Edited by Charles Eade
The End of the Beginning	1943	Cassell, London	Edited by Charles Eade
Winston Churchill, Prime Minister	1943	British Information Services, New York	
Onwards to Victory	1944	Cassell, London	Edited by Charles Eade
The Dawn of Liberation	1945	Cassell, London	Edited by Charles Eade
Victory	1946	Cassell, London	Edited by Charles Eade
Secret Sessions Speeches	1946	Cassell, London	Edited by Charles Eade; published in the US as Winston Churchill's Secret Sessions Speeches
War Speeches	1946	Cassell, London	Edited by F B Czarnomskí
World Spotlight Turns on Westminster	1946	Westminster College, Fulton, MO	
The Sinews of Peace	1948	Cassell, London	Edited by Randolph Churchill
Europe Unite: Speeches 1947 and 1948	1950	Cassell, London	Edited by Randolph Churchill
In the Balance: Speeches 1949 and 1950	1951	Cassell, London	Edited by Randolph Churchill
The War Speeches	1952	Cassell, London	Edited by Charles Eade
Stemming the Tide: Speeches 1951 and 1952	1953	Cassell, London	Edited by Randolph Churchill
The Wisdom of Sir Winston Churchill	1956	Allen & Unwin, London	
The Unwritten Alliance: Speeches 1953 and 1959	1961	Cassell, London	Edited by Randolph Churchill
Winston S. Churchill: His Complete Speeches	1974	Chelsea House, New York	Edited by Robert Rhodes James
Blood, toil, tears and sweat : the speeches of Winston Churchill	1989	Houghton Mifflin, Boston	Edited by David Cannadine

=== Miscellany ===
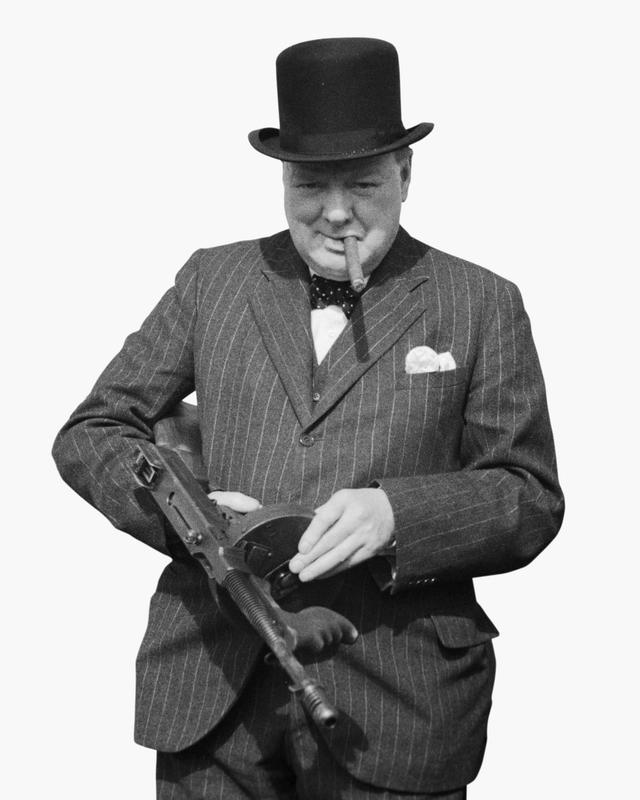
Churchill inspects a 'Tommy gun' while visiting coastal defence positions near Hartlepool on 31 July 1940.

Title	Year of first publication	First edition publisher	Notes
Charles, IXth Duke of Marlborough, KG Tributes by Rt Hon W Spencer-Churchill and C C Martindale	1934	Burns, Oates & Co, London	With C C Martindale; reprinted from The Times
Maxims and Reflections	1948	Eyre & Spottiswoode, London	Collection; revised and enlarged in 1954 as Sir Winston Churchill: A Self-Portrait
The Eagle Book of Adventure Stories	1950	Hulton Press, London	With others
King George VI: The Prime Minister's Broadcast, 7 February 1952	1952	A J St Onge, Worcester, MA	
Winston Churchill's Anti-Depression Proposal to Halt Inflation, Stabilize Prosperity, and Insure Full Freedom	1958	Public Revenue Education Council, St. Louis, MO	
Churchill: His Paintings	1967	Hamish Hamilton, London	Compiled by David Coombs and Minnie Churchill (later Mary Soames)
The Roar of the Lion	1969	Allan Wingate, London	
Joan of Arc	1969	Dodd, Mead and Company, New York	
Winston Churchill on America and Britain: A Selection of His Thoughts on America and Britain	1970	Walker	Foreword by Lady Churchill
Young Winston's Wars: The Original Dispatches of Winston S. Churchill, War Correspondent, 1897–1900	1972	Sphere Books, London	
Great Issues 71: A Forum on Important Questions Facing the American Public	1972	Troy State University, Troy, AL	With John Glubb
The Collected Works of Sir Winston Churchill	1973	Library of Imperial History, London, 1974	Edited by Frederick Wood
If I Lived My Life Again	1974	W H Allen, London	
The Collected Poems of Sir Winston Churchill	1981	Sun & Moon Press, College Park, MD	Collected and edited by F. John Herbert
Churchill and Roosevelt: The Complete Correspondence	1984	Princeton University Press, Princeton, NJ	Edited with commentary by Warren F. Kimball
Memories and Adventures	1989	Weidenfeld & Nicolson, London	
Winston Churchill and Emery Reves: Correspondence, 1937–1964	1997	University of Texas Press, Austin, TX	
Speaking for Themselves: The Personal Letters of Winston and Clementine Churchill	1998	Doubleday, London	Edited by Mary Soames

== Notes and references ==
=== Sources ===
- Addison, Paul (2004). "Churchill, Sir Winston Leonard Spencer (1874–1965)". Oxford Dictionary of National Biography (online ed.). Oxford University Press. doi:10.1093/ref:odnb/32413. (Subscription, Wikipedia Library access or UK public library membership required.)
- Baker, Anne Pimlott (2004). "Eade, Charles Stanley (1903–1964)". Oxford Dictionary of National Biography (online ed.). Oxford University Press. doi:10.1093/ref:odnb/56750. (Subscription, Wikipedia Library access or UK public library membership required.)
- Barrett, Buckley Barry (2000). Churchill: A Concise Bibliography. Westport, CT: Greenwood Publishing Group. ISBN 978-0-313-31450-6.
- Jenkins, Roy (2012). Churchill. London: Pan Macmillan. ISBN 978-0-330-47607-2.
- Johnson, Paul (2009). Churchill. London: Viking. ISBN 978-0-670-02105-5.
- Kitzan, Laurence (1990). "Sir Winston Churchill". In Beum, Robert (ed.). Dictionary of Literary Biography: Modern British Essayists. Detroit: Gale Research. ISBN 978-0-8103-4580-5.
- Kitzan, Laurence (2007). "Sir Winston Churchill". In Bruccoli, Darren (ed.). Dictionary of Literary Biography: Nobel Prize Laureates in Literature. Detroit: Gale Research. ISBN 978-1-4144-2863-5.
- Nudd, Kevin (June 1990). "Winston Churchill's Early Books". The Book and Magazine Collector (75). Diamond Publishing Group.
- Thomas, David A (February 1986). "The Historical Works of Sir Winston Churchill". The Book and Magazine Collector (24). Diamond Publishing Group.
- Thomas, David A (January 1987). "The Speeches of Sir Winston Churchill". The Book and Magazine Collector (34). Diamond Publishing Group.
- Wenden, D J (1993). "Churchill, Radio, and Cinema". In Blake, Robert B; Louis, William Roger (eds.). Churchill. Oxford: Clarendon Press. ISBN 978-0-19-820626-2.
