= Early life of Winston Churchill =

Life of Winston Churchill from 1874 to 1904

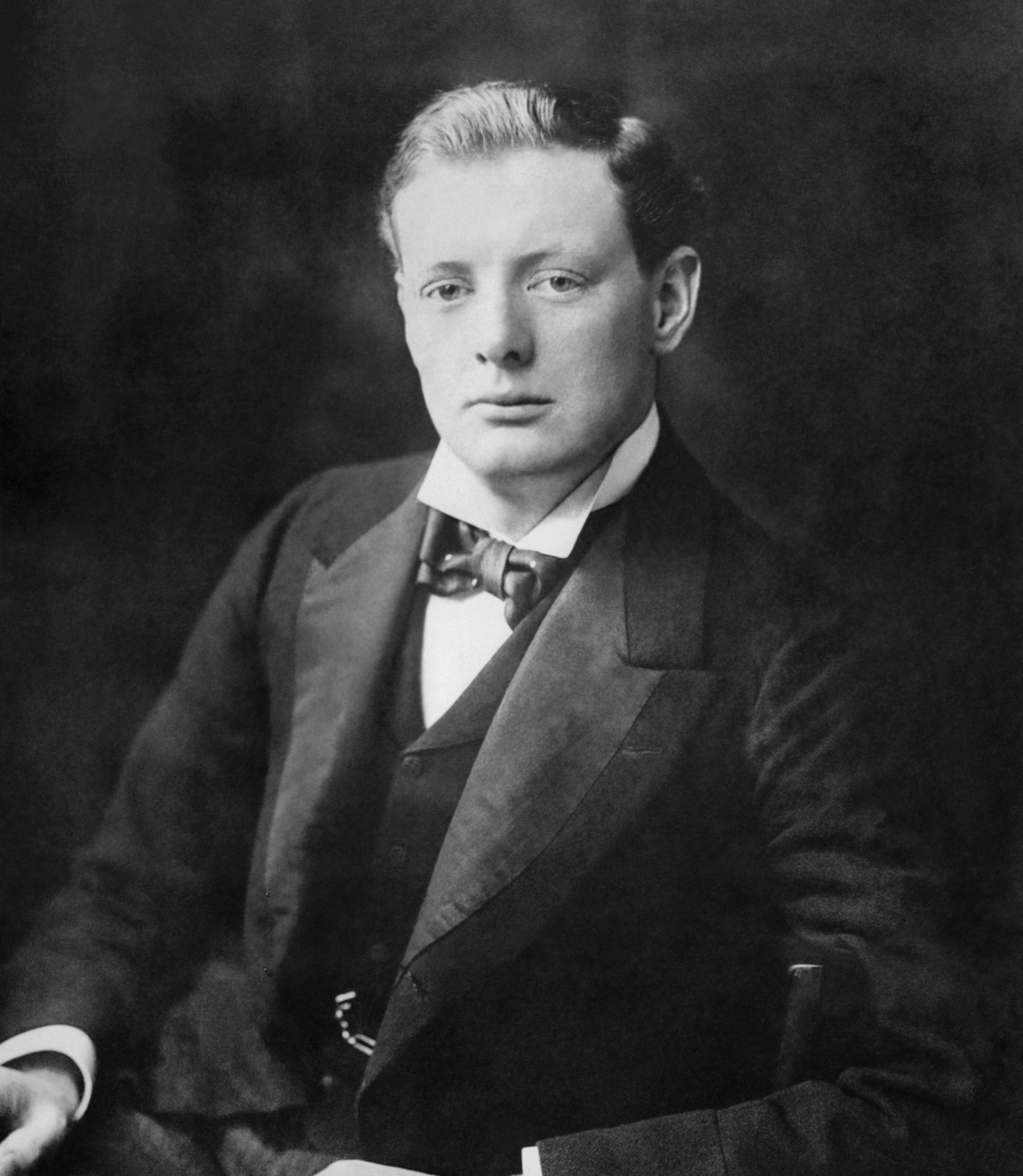
Winston Churchill in 1900, aged 25

The early life of Winston Churchill covers the period from his birth on 30 November 1874 to 31 May 1904 when he formally crossed the floor of the House of Commons, defecting from the Conservative Party to sit as a member of the Liberal Party.

Churchill had mixed English and American parentage. He was born at Blenheim Palace in Oxfordshire, England, as the elder son of Lord and Lady Randolph Churchill. He attended Harrow School and the Royal Military Academy, Sandhurst. After joining the British Army in 1895, he saw action in British India, the Anglo-Sudan War, and the Second Boer War, gaining fame as a war correspondent and by writing books about his campaigns.

Churchill began his political career as a member of the Conservative Party and was first elected as a Member of Parliament (MP), representing the Oldham constituency, on 24 October 1900. Dissatisfaction with Conservative government policy caused him to resign his party membership and join the Liberals in 1904.

== Childhood and schooling: 1874–1895 ==
=== Family background ===
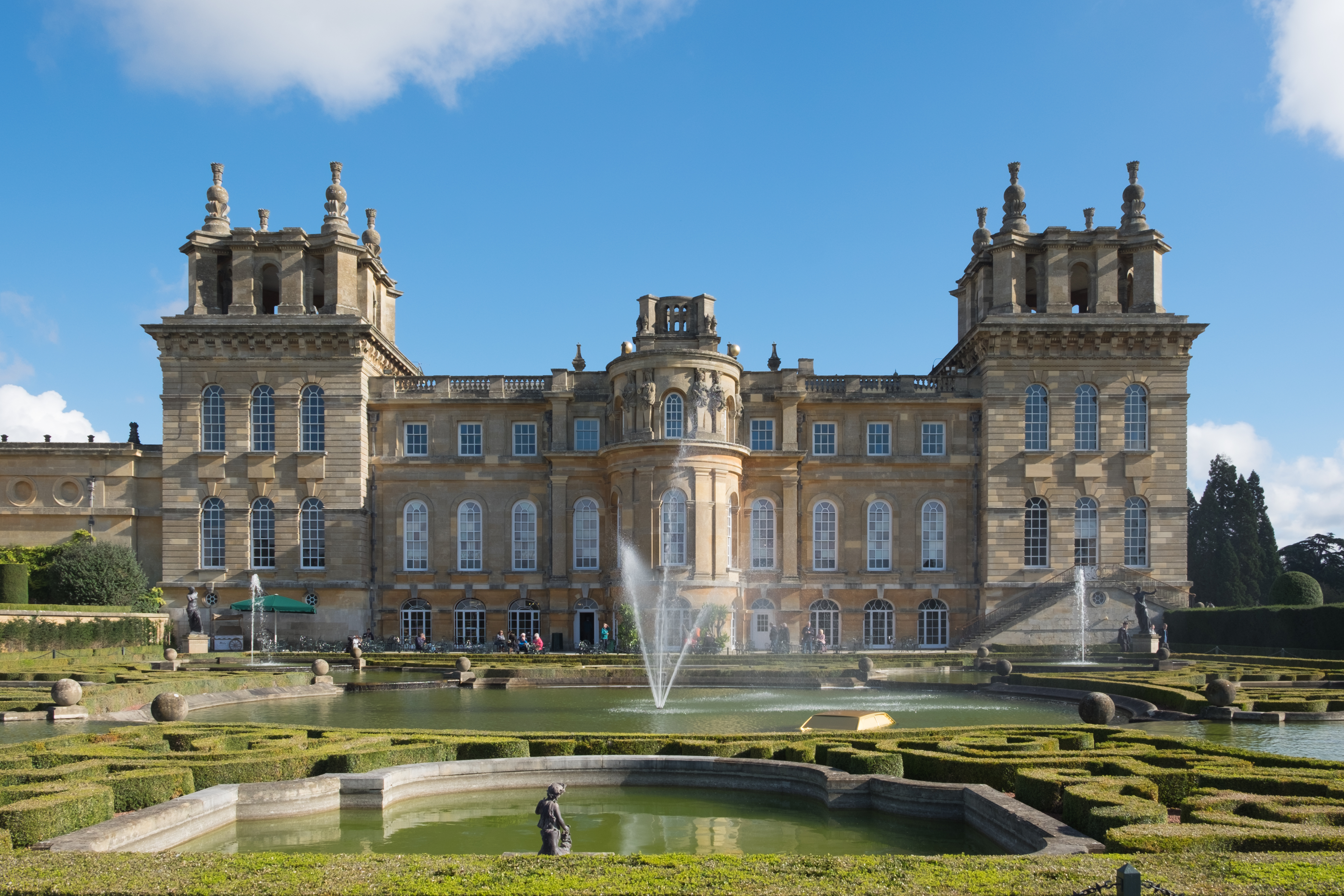
Blenheim Palace, Churchill's ancestral home and birthplace

On his father's side, Winston Churchill was a direct descendant of the Dukes of Marlborough, nominally among the higher members of the British aristocracy. The family's ancestral home is Blenheim Palace in Oxfordshire, where Churchill was born on Monday, 30 November 1874. His father was Lord Randolph Churchill (1849–1895), the third son of John Spencer-Churchill, 7th Duke of Marlborough (1822–1883). Randolph had attended Eton College and Merton College, Oxford, gaining a second-class degree in legal theory and modern history in 1870. On 12 August 1873, he attended a shipboard party at Cowes Regatta and met Jennie Jerome (1854–1921). The couple were engaged three days later. Jennie was the second daughter of Leonard Jerome (1817–1891), an American financier, and his wife Clarissa (1825–1895). Born in Brooklyn, she had lived in Paris with her mother during her teenage years. She worked as a magazine editor at one time but became a socialite who had numerous affairs.

Having been engaged in just three days, it seems that Randolph and Jennie also intended to marry quickly but were delayed by a wrangle over marriage settlement terms between their fathers. Marlborough was justifiably worried that Jerome, a speculator, had twice been bankrupted and there was a current recession in America. Jerome wanted the settlement to be controlled by Jennie and objected to then British law which granted property rights to husbands only. Marlborough wanted his son to have exclusive control. In the end, they reached a compromise and Jerome provided an income of £2,000 per year split 50/50 between Jennie and Randolph. Marlborough settled £1,100 per year on Randolph. This was a considerable amount in total and Roy Jenkins reckoned it would have been worth £150,000 per year in 2001, but it was never enough for a profligate, irresponsible pair who lived beyond their income and were frequently in debt. According to biographer Sebastian Haffner, Randolph and Jennie were "rich by normal standards but poor by those of the rich". Randolph and Jennie were married at the British Embassy in Paris on Wednesday, 15 April 1874.

John Spencer-Churchill had twice been the Member of Parliament (MP) for the former constituency of Woodstock in Oxfordshire between 1844 and 1857, when he succeeded to the dukedom. At the time of his engagement to Jennie, Randolph was interested in a political career and about to follow in his father's footsteps as the Conservative candidate for Woodstock (this constituency was abolished in 1918 and divided between Banbury and Henley). The 1874 British general election was held between 31 January and 17 February. The Conservatives, led by Benjamin Disraeli, won with an overall majority of 48 seats. Among the new intake was Randolph, aged 25.

Randolph's political career was chequered and he could perhaps be described as someone with talent who completely wasted it, mostly by unacceptably immature behaviour of which the worst trait was rudeness. He made an enemy of Robert Cecil, 3rd Marquess of Salisbury (1830–1903), who first became Prime Minister in 1885. Salisbury probably summarised Randolph very aptly when he described him as the "antithesis of the Mahdi" – Muhammad Ahmad (1848–1885). Salisbury said the Mahdi "pretends to be half mad and is very sane in reality". Salisbury nevertheless appointed Randolph as Chancellor of the Exchequer from 3 August 1886. Randolph proceeded to present budget proposals that went against the grain of Tory policy and faced opposition from the rest of the Cabinet. Outraged, Randolph sent Salisbury a letter of resignation on 22 December. Nevertheless, he arrogantly expected the Cabinet to back down so that he could continue on his own terms. Salisbury accepted his resignation and Randolph was out of frontline politics, never (unlike Winston) to return. He died young, aged 45, of a debilitating illness that may have been syphilis.

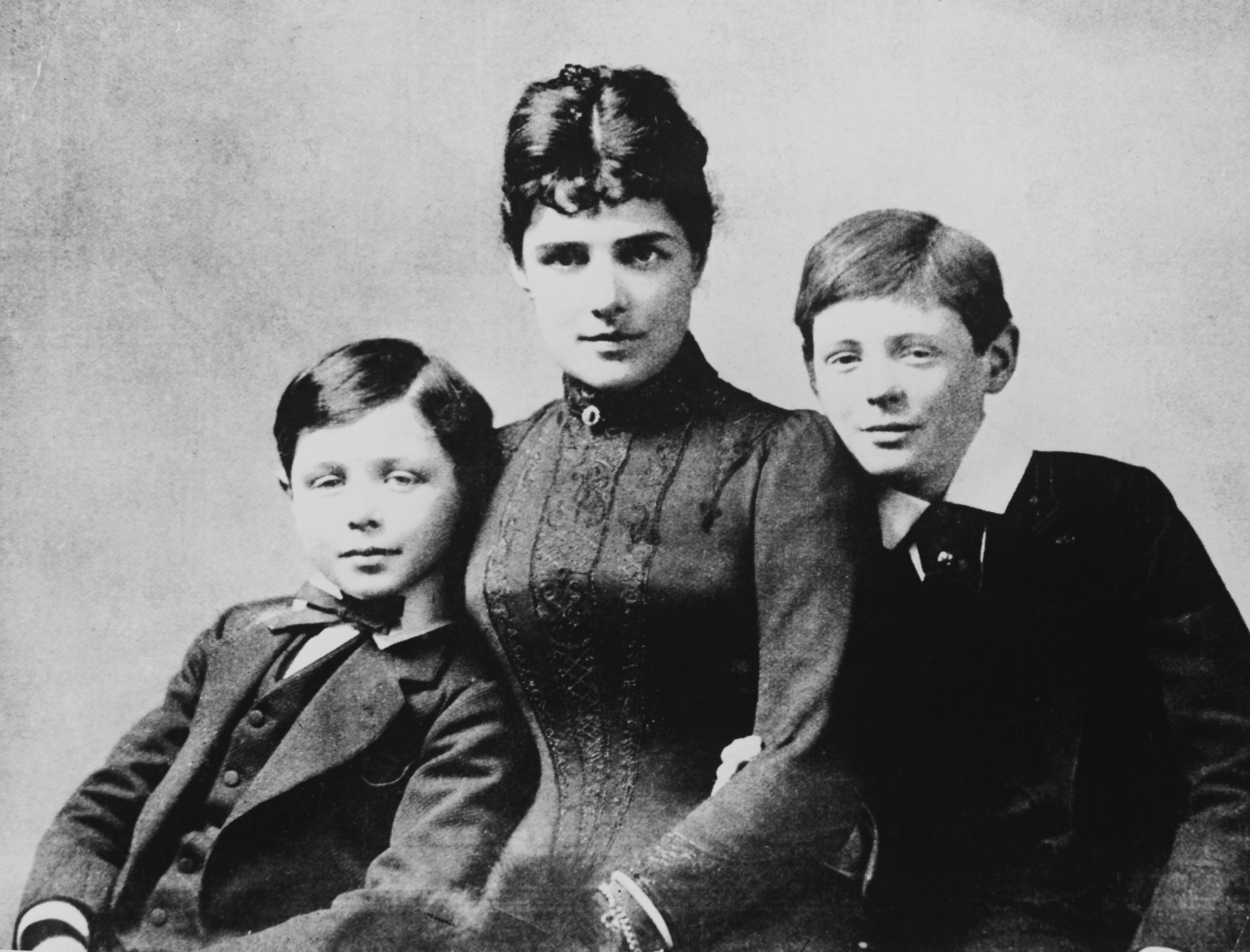
Jennie Churchill with her sons, Jack (left) and Winston (right), in 1889

Randolph and Jennie were effectively estranged for long periods and there was some speculation that her second son, Jack (1880–1947), was not Randolph's. After Randolph died, Jennie remarried in 1900 but was divorced in 1914, after a two-year separation. She was married again in 1918 to a man who was younger than Winston. In 1921, she had her left leg amputated after gangrene developed in a broken ankle. Complications arose and she died of an arterial haemorrhage, aged 67.

=== Birth and early childhood ===
Churchill was reportedly born two months premature. He was supposedly due in January 1875 and it had been intended that he would be born at his parents' house in Charles Street, Mayfair. This was being refurbished in time for his expected birth and his parents were staying at Blenheim in the meantime. Randolph later claimed that Jennie had a fall on Tuesday, 24 November 1874, while out walking with a shooting party on the Blenheim estate. She was then badly shaken up in a pony carriage which took her back to the house across rough ground. Labour pains began on the Saturday night and the local Woodstock doctor was called to attend. Churchill was born in the early hours of Monday, 30 November. The birth was normal and both he and his mother were well. Randolph and Jennie had married on 15 April, only seven and a half months before Winston's arrival and there is no certainty that he was really premature.

A few weeks after Winston was born, the Churchills engaged a nurse, Elizabeth Everest (c.1832–1895), to look after him. He nicknamed her "Woomany" and, after her death, he wrote that she had been "my dearest and most intimate friend during the whole of the twenty years I had lived". John Spencer-Churchill was appointed Viceroy of Ireland from 11 December 1876, with Randolph as his private secretary, resulting in the Churchill family's relocation to Dublin until May 1880. It was here that Winston's brother Jack was born on 4 February 1880. Winston's relationship with Jack was always warm. Mrs Everest was the primary caregiver of both Winston and Jack until they were sent away to school. She was not retained after Jack went to school but Winston maintained correspondence with her until her death. He had virtually no relationship with his father. Referring to his mother, he later stated: "I loved her dearly – but at a distance".

=== First boarding schools ===
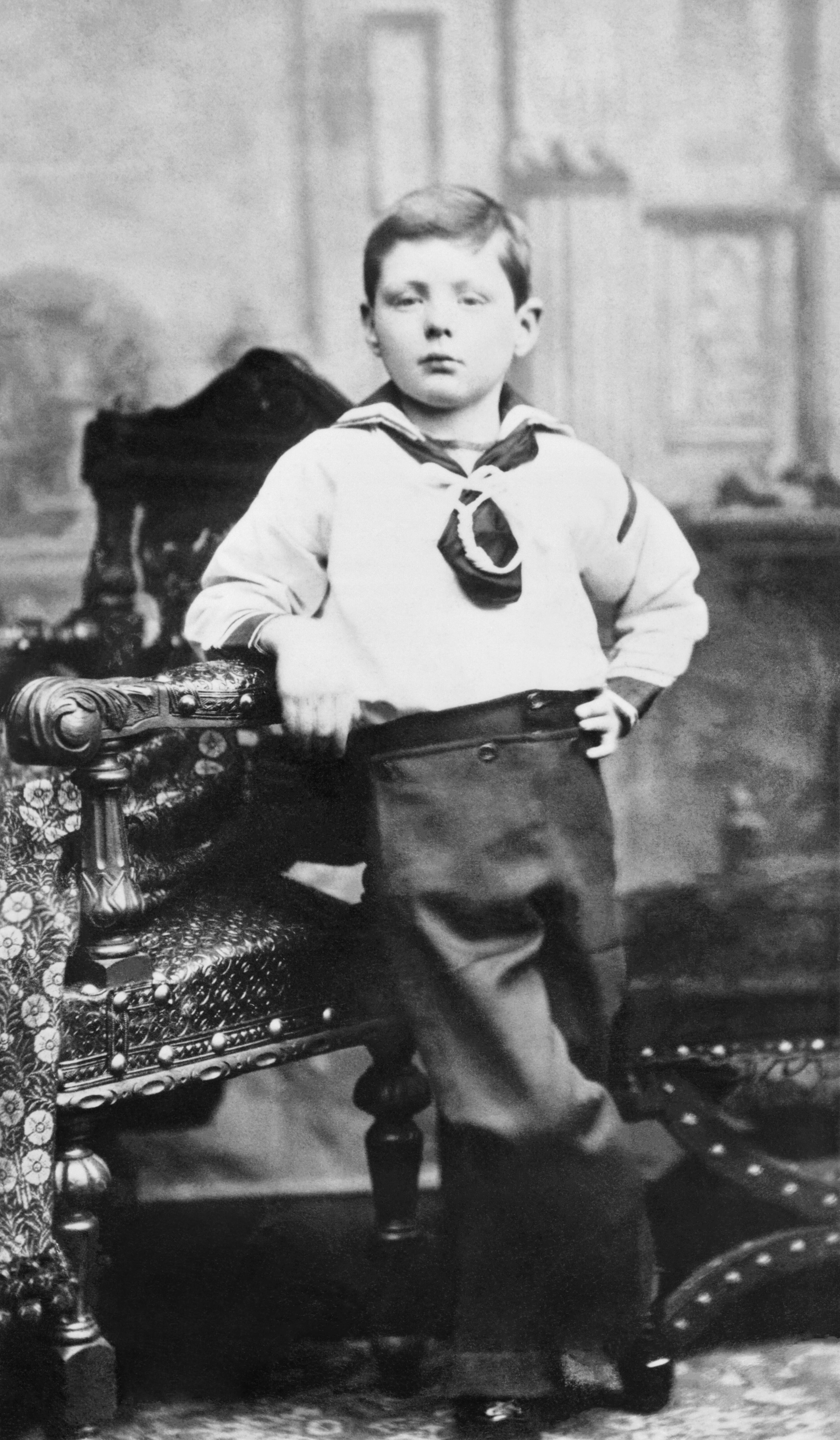
Churchill in 1881, aged six

In 1882, aged seven, Churchill began boarding at St. George's School in Ascot, Berkshire; he hated it, did poorly academically, and regularly misbehaved. Visits home were to Connaught Place in London, where his parents had settled, while they also took him on his first foreign holiday, to Gastein in Austria-Hungary. In September 1884, because of poor health, he moved to Brunswick School in Hove; there, his academic performance improved but he continued to misbehave.

=== Harrow ===
Churchill narrowly passed the Harrow School entrance exam and he became a pupil there in April 1888. He was not academically brilliant, except in English and History, and his teachers complained that he was unpunctual and careless. He wrote poetry and letters which were published in the school magazine, Harrovian, and won a fencing competition.

His father insisted that he be prepared for a career in the military, so Churchill's last three years at Harrow were spent in the army form. He performed poorly in most of his exams. On a holiday to Bournemouth in January 1893, Churchill fell from a bridge and was knocked unconscious for three days. In March he took a job at a cram school in Lexham Gardens, South Kensington, before holidaying in Switzerland and Italy that summer.

=== Sandhurst ===
After two unsuccessful attempts to gain admittance to the Royal Military College, Sandhurst, Churchill succeeded on his third attempt. There, he was accepted as a cadet in the cavalry, starting his education in September 1893. In August 1894 he and his brother holidayed in Belgium, and he spent free time in London, joining protests at the closing of the Empire Theatre, which he had frequented. His Sandhurst education lasted for 15 months; he graduated in December 1894. In January 1895, shortly after Churchill finished at Sandhurst, his father died; this led Churchill to adopt the belief that members of his family inevitably died young.

== Cuba, India, and Sudan: 1895–1899 ==
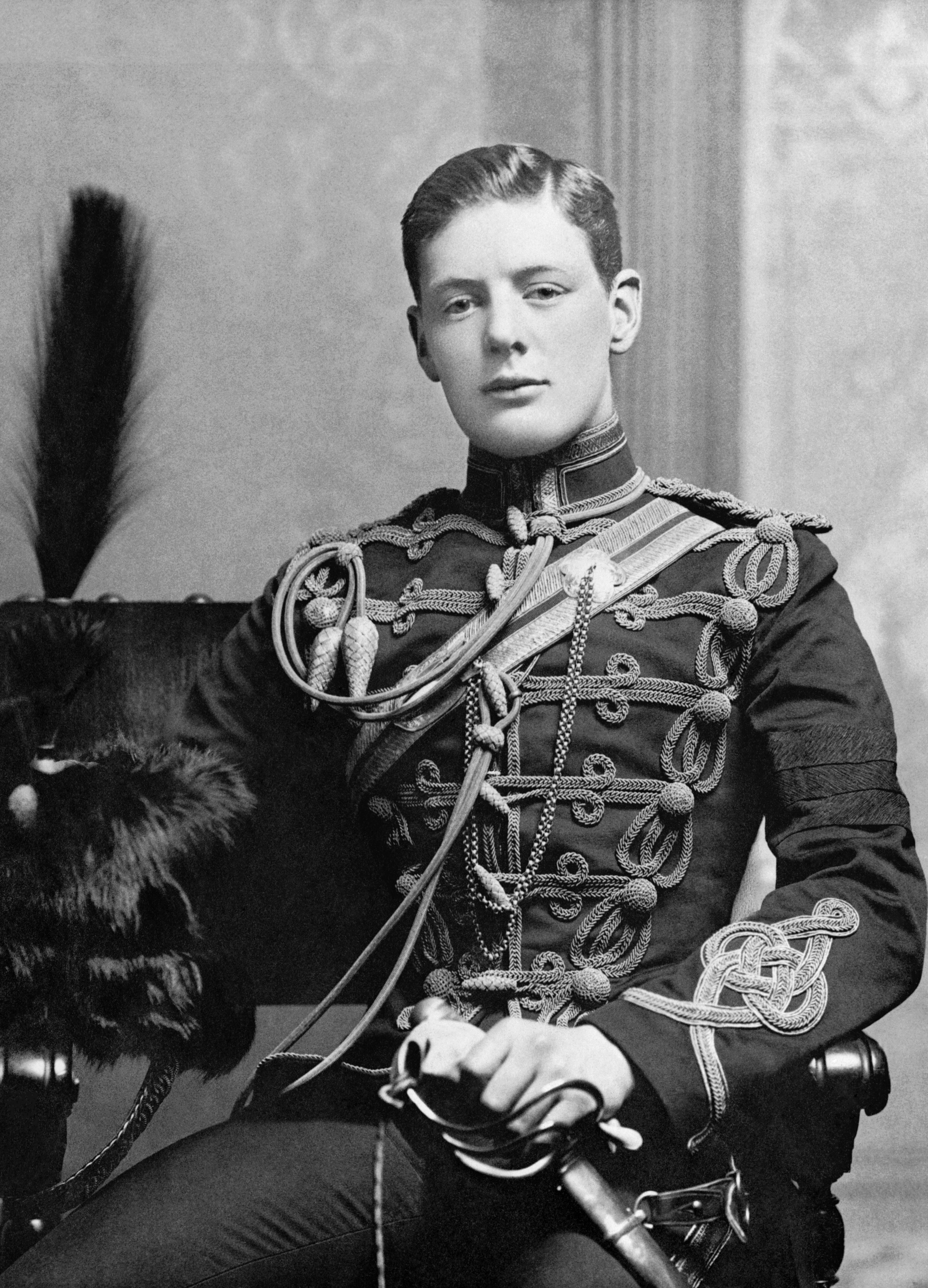
Churchill at Aldershot in 1895, wearing the military dress uniform of the 4th Queen's Own Hussars

In February 1895, Churchill was commissioned as a second lieutenant in the 4th Queen's Own Hussars regiment of the British Army, based at Aldershot. In July, he rushed to Crouch Hill, North London to sit with Mrs Everest as she lay dying, subsequently organising her funeral. Churchill was eager to witness military action and used his mother's influence to try to get himself posted to a war zone. In the autumn of 1895, he and Reginald Barnes traveled to Cuba to observe its war of independence; they joined Spanish troops attempting to suppress independence fighters and were caught up in several skirmishes. He also spent time in New York City, staying with the wealthy politician Bourke Cockran, who profoundly influenced the young Churchill. Churchill admired the United States, writing to his brother that it was "a very great country" and telling his mother "what an extraordinary people the Americans are!"

With the Hussars, Churchill arrived in Bombay, British India, in October 1896. They were soon transferred to Bangalore, where he shared a bungalow with Barnes. Describing India as a "godless land of snobs and bores", Churchill remained there for 19 months, during the course of which he made three visits to Calcutta, expeditions to Hyderabad and the North West Frontier, and two visits back to Britain. Believing himself poorly educated, he began a project of self-education, reading the work of Plato, Adam Smith, Charles Darwin, and Henry Hallam. Most influential for him were Edward Gibbon's The History of the Decline and Fall of the Roman Empire, Winwood Reade's The Martyrdom of Man, and the writings of Thomas Babington Macaulay.

Interested in British parliamentary affairs, in one letter he declared himself "a Liberal in all but name", but added that he could never endorse the Liberal Party's support for Irish home rule. Instead, he allied himself to the Tory democracy wing of the Conservative Party, and on a visit home gave his first public speech for the Conservative's Primrose League in Bath. Reflecting a mix of reformist and conservative perspectives, he supported the promotion of secular, non-denominational education while opposing women's suffrage, referring to the Suffragettes as "a ridiculous movement".

Churchill decided to join Bindon Blood's Malakand Field Force in its campaign against Mohmand rebels in the Swat Valley of what is today Northwestern Pakistan. Blood agreed on the condition that Churchill be assigned as a journalist; to ensure this, he gained accreditation from The Pioneer and The Daily Telegraph, for whom he wrote regular updates. In letters to family, he described how both sides in the conflict slaughtered each other's wounded, although he omitted any reference to such actions by British troops in his published reports. He remained with the British troops for six weeks before returning to Bangalore in October 1897. There, he wrote his first book, The Story of the Malakand Field Force, which was published by Longman to largely positive reviews. He also wrote his only work of fiction, Savrola, a political adventure story set in an imagined Balkan kingdom. It was serialised in Macmillan's Magazine between May–December 1899 before appearing in book form.

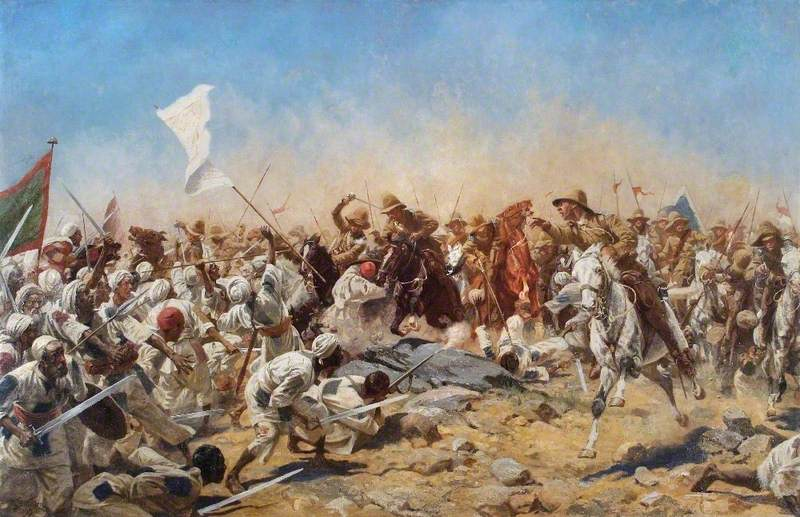
A depiction of the Battle of Omdurman in 1898; in the battle, Churchill took part in a cavalry charge.

While in Bangalore in the first half of 1898, Churchill explored the possibility of joining Herbert Kitchener's military campaign in the Sudan. Kitchener was initially reluctant, claiming that Churchill was simply seeking publicity and medals. After spending time in Calcutta, Meerut, and Peshawar, Churchill sailed back to England from Bombay in June. There, he used his contacts—including a visit to the Prime Minister Lord Salisbury at 10 Downing Street—to get himself assigned to Kitchener's campaign. He agreed that he would write a column describing the events for The Morning Post. Arriving in Egypt, he joined the 21st Lancers at Cairo before they headed south along the River Nile to take part in the Battle of Omdurman against the army of Sudanese leader Abdallahi ibn Muhammad. Churchill was critical of Kitchener's actions during the war, particularly the latter's unmerciful treatment of enemy wounded and his desecration of Muhammad Ahmad's tomb in Omdurman. Following the battle, Churchill gave skin from his chest for a graft for an injured officer. Back in England by October, Churchill wrote an account of the campaign, published as The River War in November 1899.

== Politics and South Africa: 1899–1901 ==
Seeking a parliamentary career, Churchill pursued political contacts and gave addresses at three Conservative Party meetings. At this point he courted Pamela Plowden; although a relationship did not ensue, they remained lifelong friends. In December he returned to India for three months, largely to indulge his love of the game polo. While in Calcutta, he stayed in the home of Viceroy George Nathaniel Curzon. On the journey home, he spent two weeks in Cairo, where he was introduced to the Khedive Abbas II, before arriving in England in April. He refocused his attention on politics, addressing further Conservative meetings and networking at events such as a Rothschild's dinner party. He was selected as one of the two Conservative parliamentary candidates at the June 1899 by-election in Oldham, Lancashire. While campaigning in Oldham, Churchill referred to himself as "a Conservative and a Tory Democrat". Although the Oldham seats had previously been held by the Conservatives, the election was a narrow Liberal victory.

Anticipating the outbreak of the Second Boer War between Britain and the Boer Republics, Churchill sailed from Southampton to South Africa as a journalist writing for the Daily Mail and Morning Post. In October, he travelled from Cape Town to the conflict zone near Ladysmith, then besieged by Boer troops, before spending time at Estcourt. He set out for Colenso but his train was derailed by Boer artillery fire. Churchill was captured as a prisoner of war and interned in Pretoria. In December, he escaped over the prison's latrine wall and managed to stow away aboard a freight train. Later, he hid inside a mine, shielded by the sympathetic English owner. Wanted by the Boer authorities, he stowed away aboard another freight train and hid among coal sacks to narrowly evade recapture. He finally reached safety in Portuguese East Africa.

Sailing to Durban, Churchill found that his escape had attracted much publicity in Britain. In January 1900 he was appointed a lieutenant in the South African Light Horse regiment, joining General Buller's fight to relieve the Siege of Ladysmith and take Pretoria. In his writings during the campaign, he chastised British hatred for the Boer, calling for them to be treated with "generosity and tolerance" and urging a "speedy peace"; after the war he called for the British to be magnanimous in victory. He was among the first British troops into Ladysmith and Pretoria. He and his cousin, the Duke of Marlborough, were able to get ahead of the rest of the troops in Pretoria, where they demanded and received the surrender of 52 Boer prison camp guards. After the victory in Pretoria, he returned to Cape Town and sailed for Britain in July. In May, while he had still been in South Africa, his Morning Post despatches had been published as London to Ladysmith via Pretoria, which sold well.

Arriving in Southampton in July 1900, Churchill rented a flat in London's Mayfair, using it as his base for the next six years. He stood again as one of the Conservative candidates at Oldham in the October 1900 general election, securing a narrow victory to become an MP at age 25. In the same month, he published Ian Hamilton's March, a book about his South African experiences, which became the focus of a lecture tour in November through Britain, America and Canada. MPs were unpaid and the tour was a financial necessity. In America, Churchill met Mark Twain, President McKinley and Vice President Theodore Roosevelt; he did not get on well with Roosevelt. In spring 1901 he gave more lectures in Paris, Madrid and Gibraltar.

== Conservative MP: 1901–1904 ==
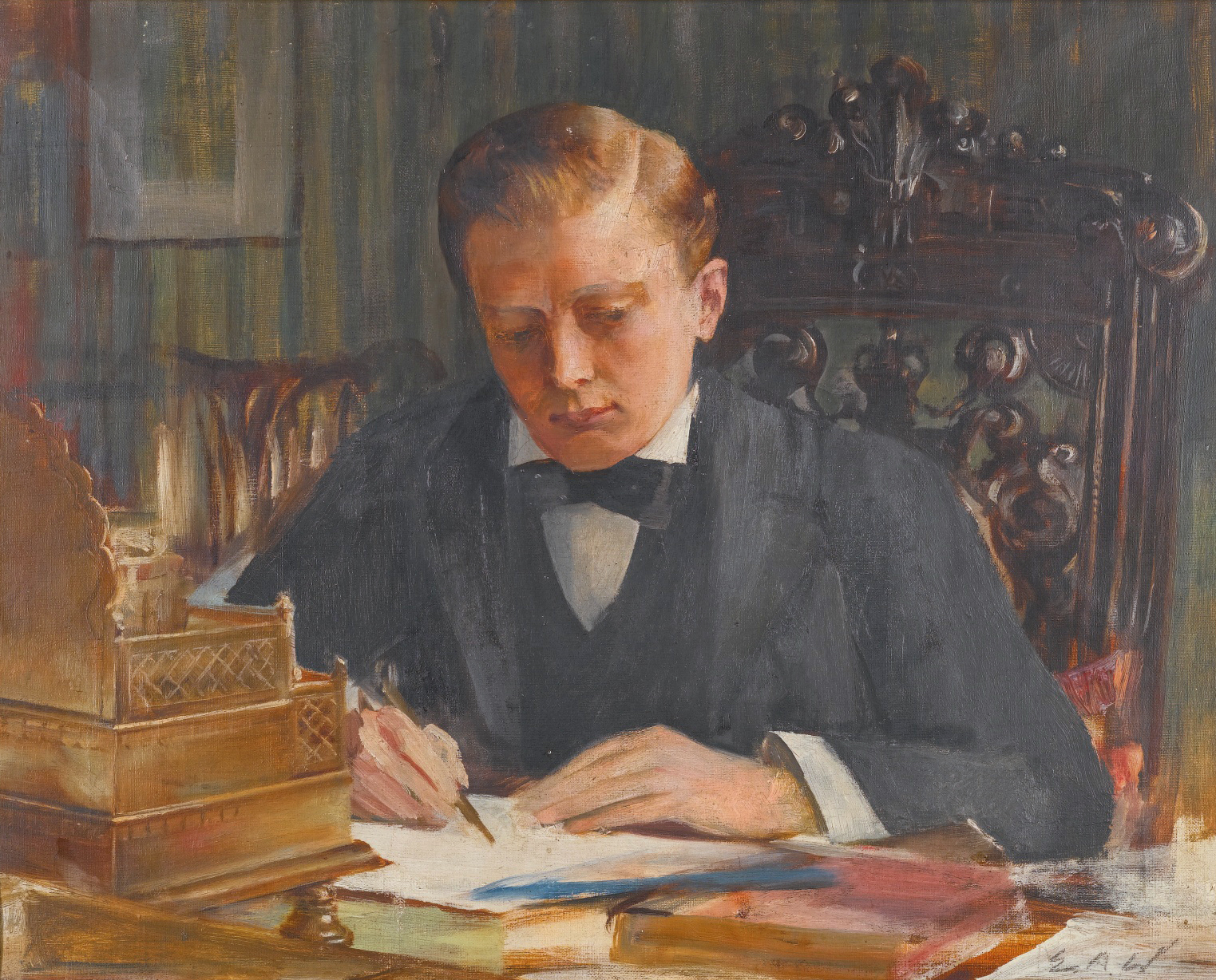
A painting of the young Churchill by Edwin Arthur Ward

In February 1901, Churchill took his seat in the House of Commons, where his maiden speech gained widespread press coverage. He associated with a group of Conservatives known as the Hughligans, although he was critical of the Conservative government on various issues. He condemned the British execution of a Boer military commandant, and voiced concerns about the levels of public expenditure; in response, Prime Minister Arthur Balfour asked him to join a parliamentary select committee on the topic. He opposed increases to army funding, suggesting that any additional military expenditure should go to the navy. This upset the Conservative front bench but gained support from Liberals. He increasingly socialised with senior Liberals, particularly Liberal Imperialists like H. H. Asquith. In this context, he later wrote, he "drifted steadily to the left" of British parliamentary politics. He privately considered "the gradual creation by an evolutionary process of a Democratic or Progressive wing to the Conservative Party", or alternately a "Central Party" to unite the Conservatives and Liberals.

By 1903, Churchill was increasingly dissatisfied with the Conservatives, in part due to their promotion of economic protectionism, but also because he had attracted the animosity of many party members and was likely aware that this might have prevented him gaining a Cabinet position under a Conservative government. The Liberal Party was then attracting growing support, and so his defection in 1904 may also have been influenced by personal ambition. In a 1903 letter, he referred to himself as an "English Liberal ... I hate the Tory party, their men, their words and their methods". In the House of Commons, he increasingly voted with the Liberal opposition against the government. In February 1903, Churchill was among 18 Conservative MPs who voted against the government's increase in military expenditure. He backed the Liberal vote of censure against the use of Chinese indentured labourers in South Africa, and in favour of a Liberal bill to restore legal rights to trade unions. His April 1904 parliamentary speech upholding the rights of trade unions was described by the pro-Conservative Daily Mail as "Radicalism of the reddest type". In May 1903, Joseph Chamberlain, the Secretary of State for the Colonies, called for the introduction of tariffs on goods imported into the British Empire from outside; Churchill became a leading Conservative voice against such economic protectionism. Describing himself as a "sober admirer" of "the principles of Free Trade", in July he was a founding member of the anti-protectionist Free Food League. In October, Balfour's government sided with Chamberlain and announced protectionist legislation.

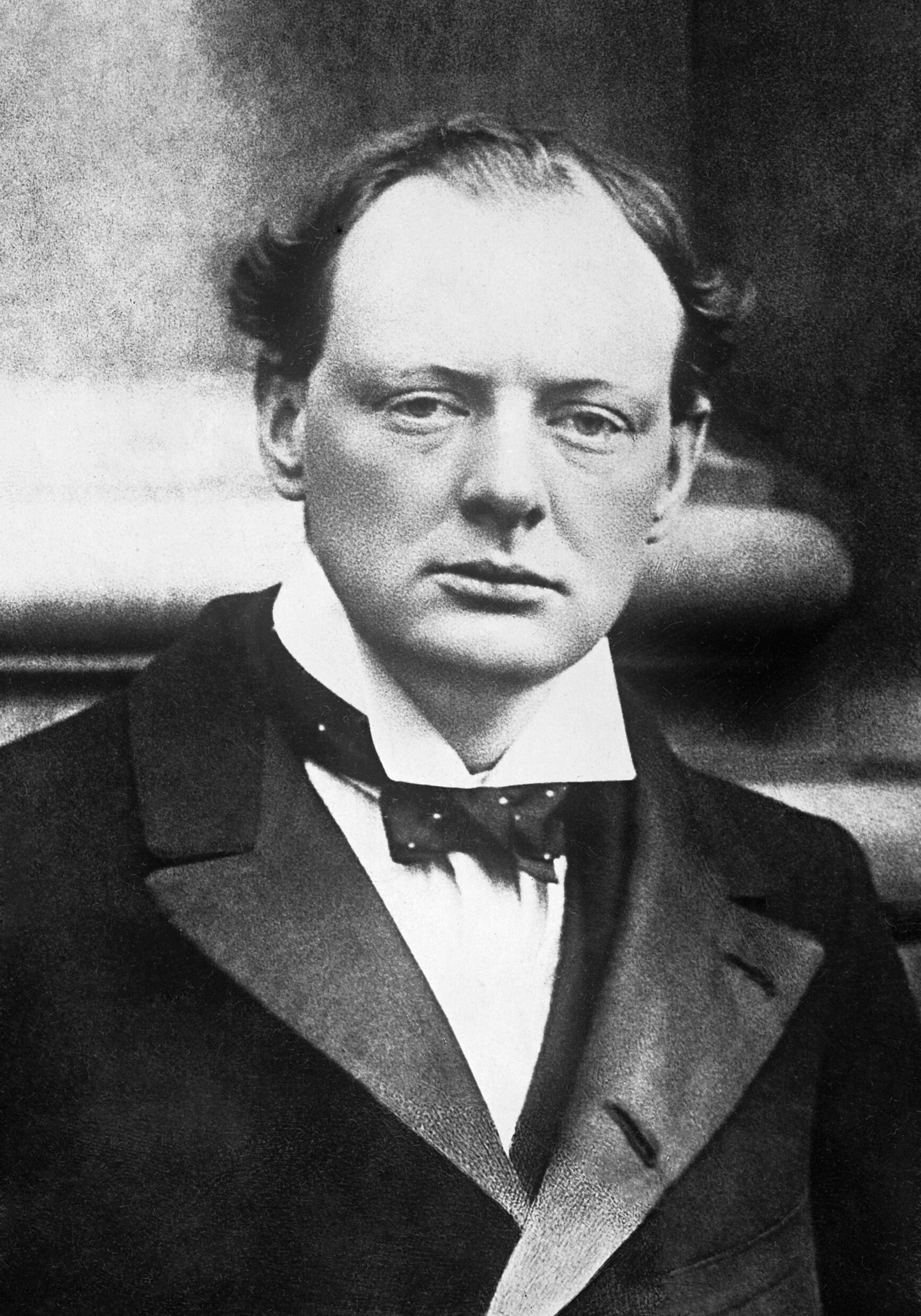
Churchill in 1904, aged 29

Churchill's outspoken criticism of Balfour's government and imperial protectionism, coupled with a letter of support he sent to a Liberal candidate in Ludlow, angered many Conservatives. In December 1903, the Oldham Conservative Association informed him that it would not support his candidature in the next general election. In March 1904, Balfour and the Conservative front bench walked out of the House of Commons during one of his speeches. In May he expressed opposition to the government's proposed Aliens Bill, which was designed to curb Jewish migration into Britain. He stated that the bill would "appeal to insular prejudice against foreigners, to racial prejudice against Jews, and to labour prejudice against competition" and expressed himself in favour of "the old tolerant and generous practice of free entry and asylum to which this country has so long adhered and from which it has so greatly gained". On 31 May 1904, he crossed the floor, defecting from the Conservatives to sit as a member of the Liberal Party in the House of Commons.
