= The Empire of Business =

Collection of essays by Andrew Carnegie

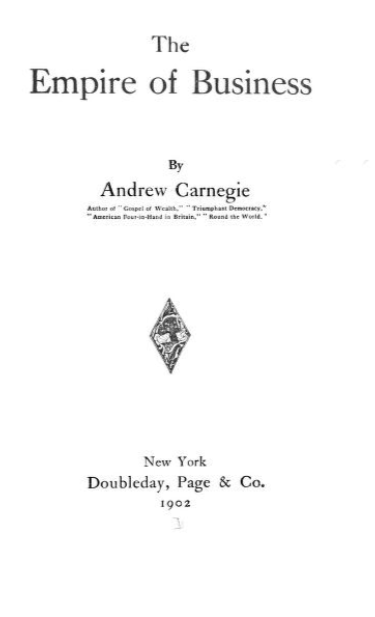
- Title page for The Empire of Business (1902)
- Author: Andrew Carnegie
- Language: English
- Genre: Essay Collection
- Publication date: 1902
- Publication place: United States

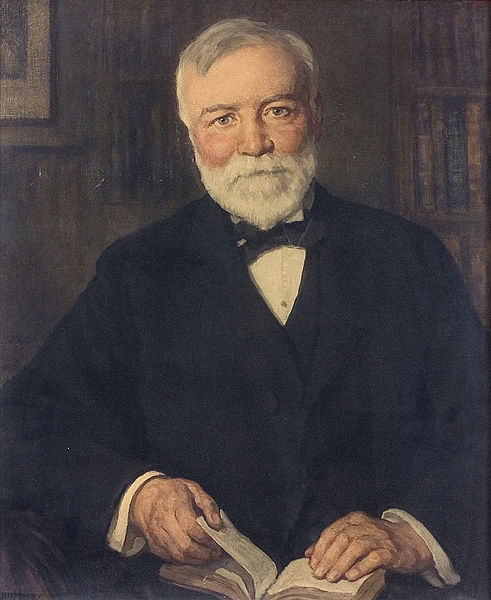
Andrew Carnegie by Francis Luis Mora

The Empire of Business is a collection of essays written by Scottish-American industrialist Andrew Carnegie which were published in book form in 1902.

The book shares his shrewd outlook on the economic situation in America at the turn of the 20th century; Carnegie discusses the rewards of hard work, integrity, frugality and other prudent qualities such as the "bugaboo of trusts" that he believes every person should possess if they wish to achieve success in their lifetime. Topics include the state of the oil and steel industries within the United States and the best uses of tariffs.

The essays that form the book have been gathered from a number of well received publications from the era, these include the New York Evening Post, the New York Journal and Macmillan's Magazine. The Empire of Business provides the reader with an insight into one of history’s most notable entrepreneurs. Andrew Carnegie is also often described as the most prominent philanthropist in history.

== Bibliography ==
- The Empire of Business, by Andrew Carnegie. New York: Cornell University Library, 2009. ISBN 1112201025
