= Savrola =

1900 novel by Winston S. Churchill

- Chivers 1973 edition
- Author: Winston S. Churchill
- Genre: Fiction
- Publisher: Longman, Green and Co.
- Publication date: 1900
- Publication place: UK
- Media type: Print
- Pages: 345 (1st edition)
- OCLC: 4900630

Savrola: A Tale of the Revolution in Laurania is the only major fictional work of Winston S. Churchill. The story describes events in the capital of Laurania, a fictional European state, as unrest against the dictatorial government of President Antonio Molara turns to violent revolution.

Churchill began writing the novel on his voyage from Britain to India to take part in the Malakand campaign in August 1897. Churchill was on leave from his posting with the army in India when he had news of fighting in Malakand, and immediately arranged to return. The book was started before, and completed after, writing the nonfiction work The Story of the Malakand Field Force about his experiences there. He wrote to his brother in May 1898 that the book had been completed. The working title for the book was Affairs of State. It was initially published as a serialisation in Macmillan's Magazine between May and December 1898, and was then published as a book in February 1900.

== Background ==
Savrola is in many respects a conventional example of the "Ruritanian" genre, being published just four years after the classic The Prisoner of Zenda, by Anthony Hope. The politics and institutions of Laurania reflect the values of England as Churchill experienced them. A comparison has been drawn between Molara and Oliver Cromwell, against whom an ancestor of Churchill's, also named Winston Churchill, fought as a captain of horse, something which would have been familiar to Churchill as part of his family history. The capital and its institutions are a miniature of London, so the State ball follows the etiquette of the great society gatherings in London which Churchill would have attended.

The heroine of the story, Lucile, is believed to have been modelled upon Churchill's mother, Lady Randolph Churchill. Lucile is married to the out-of-touch ruler of Laurania, Molara. Lucile abandons Molara for the charms of Savrola, a character more like Churchill himself. One of the characters, Tiro, an officer in the republican guard, discusses his life in conversation with Savrola, mirroring the life of a subaltern officer in the Indian Army which Churchill had experienced. Savrola himself is described as "vehement, high and daring", and the sort of man who could "know rest only in action, contentment only in danger, and in confusion find their only peace... Ambition was the motive force, and he was powerless to resist it". The story contains a nurse, who again has been compared to Churchill's own nurse, Mrs Everest. The book is dedicated to the officers of the 4th Hussars, Churchill's regiment.

== Critical reception ==
Churchill first sought the opinion of friends and relations about the book. He asked his grandmother, Frances, Duchess of Marlborough, to comment, with particular reference to the character of Lucile. She responded that she felt the book was worthy of publication, particularly since it already had the prospect of a reasonable financial return, but felt the plot might be improved. She was impressed by the descriptions of fighting, but agreed with Churchill's concerns about Lucile, suggesting that the character betrayed his lack of experience of women. However, an offer of £100 from the Morning Post for the right to serialise the book left Churchill no time for amendments, and it was published as it stood.

The book was reviewed by the newspaper The Star, which was modestly impressed. The reviewer considered that it was clearly inferior to The River War, which Churchill had already published, although this book was written earlier, but would otherwise have been a promising start. It was compared to the works of Benjamin Disraeli, a politician who also wrote novels containing significant amounts of social comment. The reviewer observed that in both cases the books served to maintain public interest in their authors. The characters were described as "stock puppets of brisk romance", but the fighting scenes were impressive and full of suspense.

The Echo was less impressed. While acknowledging that the book showed promise and was interesting, it was critical of the lack of detail in the plot and in love scenes. Unlike some other reviews, which had been entertained by the philosophy and political comment, this considered the "desperate efforts after intellectuality" as simply dull. It felt the book was overly dependent on fighting and bloodshed to carry it along.

The book was not an enormous success, but has persisted. In 1965 a review by Bryan Magee for Encounter observed that the book had hung on in libraries as an adventure tale for children, but regretted that it was neglected by adults. The review recognised that perhaps its greatest interest was now the insight it gave as to Churchill's beliefs as a young man. The character of Savrola identified precisely with Churchill himself, with what he wished to be and what he later became.

Churchill's own verdict on his early foray into fiction was given in his 1930 autobiography My Early Life: "I have consistently urged my friends to abstain from reading it."

== Plot ==
Events take place in a fictional country called Laurania, located somewhere on the Mediterranean Sea, which is similar to Italy, but with an overlay of Victorian England. Laurania has an African colony which can be reached via the Suez Canal. It has been a republic for many years, and has a well established constitution. Five years previously (stated to be in 1883) the country was split by a civil war, as a result of which General Antonio Molara became president and Dictator. Unrest has arisen because of Molara's refusal to restore parliamentary rule, and the final events of his dictatorship are described in the book.

The story opens with a description of the capital and fast-moving political events there. Molara has bowed to popular pressure for elections, but intends to do so on the basis of a grossly amended electoral register. Savrola is seen as the leader of the revolutionaries, deciding what they are to do, and presiding over conflicting factions with differing aims. Despite the unrest, society still proceeds on the surface in a genteel course, with state balls and society events. Molara decides to ask his young and beautiful wife, Lucile, to attempt to seduce Savrola and discover anything she can about his plans. Unfortunately for him, Lucile finds herself attracted to Savrola and her loyalties become confused.

Events move from political maneuvering to street fighting when a rebel army invades Laurania. While Savrola knows about the army and intended invasion, he has poor control over it, so the invasion has started without his knowledge or proper preparations. Both sides scramble for a fight, as Molara finds the country's regular troops refuse to obey his orders. He is obliged to despatch most of the loyal Republican Guard from the capital to oppose the invaders, leaving him with a much reduced force to hold the capital. Fierce street fighting takes place in the capital between the revolutionaries of the Popular Party and the Republican Guard. The revolution culminates in the storming of the Presidential Palace and General Molara's death on the steps of his palace. The revolutionary allies start to break apart in the face of a threat by the Lauranian navy (which remains loyal to the president), to bombard the city unless Savrola is handed over to them. The council of public safety decides the most expedient position would be to agree to this, but Savrola escapes attempts to arrest him and flees with Lucile. The city is subsequently bombarded when Savrola is not produced, and the last scene is of Savrola watching the destruction from outside the city.

== Editions ==
Savrola was initially published as a book of 345 pages and 70,000 words by Longman Green and Co. The serial rights were sold to Macmillan's Magazine for £100. Overall, by serialisation and publication in the Longman editions in different countries it earned approximately £700 for Churchill. It was serialised again in the Sunday Dispatch in 1954 on the occasion of Churchill's 80th birthday. A dramatisation of the story was broadcast in 1964 as part of Saturday Night Theatre by BBC Radio, while it was televised in the States in 1956 in a brief version which Churchill himself criticised as lacking the original's status as "a thorough-going rip-roaring melodrama”.

The first edition was published in the US by Longmans in November 1899, with a print run of 4,000 copies. This was shortly followed in January 1900 by the UK edition of 1,500 copies. 4,500 copies were issued of a colonial edition distributed throughout the empire, although a separate edition was issued in Canada by Copp Clark using the same Longman's imprint.

In 1908, a paperback illustrated edition of 128 pages was published in the UK by George Newnes. In 1915, a new hardback edition of 25,000 copies and 260 pages was issued by Hodder and Stoughton. In 1956 a second American edition of 241 pages was published by Random House. In 1957 a paperback edition of 222 pages was issued in the UK by Beacon Books. In 1973 a hardback edition of 260 pages was published by Cedric Chivers Ltd. on behalf of the Library Association. Another USA edition was produced in 1976 by Amereon House. In 1990 Leo Cooper published a further UK edition, and others have been produced.

There have been a number of editions translated into French, including a 1948 three-part condensed edition released through the magazine France Illustration Littéraire et Théâtrale, a 1948 paperback published by Plon, and a 1950 paperback referred to as the "Monaco Edition" by enthusiasts.
