= The World Crisis =

Winston Churchill's account of the First World War

- Cover page of Volume II (Thornton Butterworth Limited, 1923)
- Author: Winston Churchill and assistants
- Language: English
- Subject: First World War
- Publisher: Thornton Butterworth and Charles Scribner’s Sons
- Publication date: 1923–1931
- Publication place: United Kingdom

The World Crisis is Winston Churchill's account of the First World War, published in six volumes (technically five, as Volume III was published in two parts). Published between 1923 and 1931: in many respects it prefigures his better-known multivolume The Second World War. The World Crisis is analytical and, in some parts, a justification by Churchill of his role in the war. Churchill denied it was a "history," describing the work in Vol. 2 as "a contribution to history of which note should be taken together with other accounts."

His American biographer William Manchester wrote: "His masterpiece is The World Crisis, published over a period of several years, 1923 to 1931, a six-volume, 3,261-page account of the Great War, beginning with its origins in 1911 and ending with its repercussions in the 1920s. Magnificently written, it is enhanced by the presence of the author at the highest councils of war and in the trenches as a battalion commander". The British historian Robert Rhodes James writes: "For all its pitfalls as history, The World Crisis must surely stand as Churchill’s masterpiece. After it, anything must appear as anticlimax". Rhodes James further comments, "Churchill’s literary work showed a certain decline in the 1930s" and that his Marlborough and A History of the English-Speaking Peoples have more of a rhetorical note than The World Crisis.

The news he was writing about the war was all over London; he chose The Times for the serial rights rather than the magazine Metropolitan, and with advances from his English and American publishers, he told a guest in 1921 that it was exhilarating to write for half a crown a word (a pound for eight words). The title was settled as The World Crisis rather than Sea Power and the World Crisis. Geoffrey Dawson of The Times had suggested The Great Amphibian. The question of copyright and of quoting confidential government documents was raised by Bonar Law, but other authors, including Fisher, Jellicoe and Kitchener, had already used such documents in writing their own memoirs.

Successive volumes were published from 1923 to 1931 by Thornton Butterworth in England and Charles Scribner’s Sons in America. The first (American) advances enabled him to purchase a new Rolls-Royce in August 1921. In 1922, he had purchased Chartwell, a large house requiring expensive repairs and rebuilding. He justified his position and actions such as on the Dardanelles Campaign. The reception was generally good, but an unnamed colleague said, "Winston has written an enormous book about himself, and called it The World Crisis." Arthur Balfour said he was reading Churchill’s "autobiography disguised as a history of the universe".

== Volumes ==
=== Volume I: 1911–1914 (published 1923) ===
Although nominally starting in 1911 when Churchill became First Lord of the Admiralty, the narrative commences in 1870 with the Franco-Prussian War and ends with Turkey and the Balkans. Churchill comments on German "threats of war" over recognition by Serbia of the Austrian annexation of Bosnia and Herzegovina in 1908, which led to talks between the British and French General Staffs over concerted action in the event of war. "Algeciras was a milestone on the road to Armageddon." (pp. 32–33) Again over Agadir and the French in Morocco in 1911 Germany was "prepared to go to the very edge of the precipice", and was surprised by the British reaction (the Mansion House speech of Lloyd George).

The design and ordering of the British dreadnought fleet has a chapter, given his involvement. The start of the war in France is followed by the Admiralty and Fisher, and the naval battles of Coronel and the Falklands. The last chapter is on the bombardment of the English "open towns" of Hartlepool, Scarborough and Whitby by the German battle-cruiser squadron when nearly 500 civilians were killed; there was "much indignation at the failure of the Navy but the Navy could not explain for fear of compromising our secret information".

=== Volume II: 1915 (published 1923) ===
1915 is described as a "year of ill-fortune to the cause of the Allies", starting with the Deadlock in the West, mention of Tanks and Smoke, and ending with the Dardanelles campaign (Gallipoli). Churchill complains in his preface that "upon me alone among the high authorities concerned (with the Dardanelles) was the penalty inflicted – not of loss of office, for that is a petty thing – but of interruption and deprivation of control while the fate of the enterprise was still in suspense".

=== Volume III: 1916–1918 (published 1927, in Parts I and II) ===
This volume starts with the Allied High Command at the beginning of 1916, and the combatants evenly matched for a prolonged struggle. There are chapters on Verdun, Jutland, the Somme, the Roumanian disaster, the removal of Ferdinand Foch and Joseph Joffre after the Somme (Robert Nivelle replacing the latter as French Commander-in-Chief), and American intervention. A chapter on Britain covers the Derby scheme and conscription, the Press and Lloyd George becoming prime minister. During the first eighteen months of the events covered, Churchill was out of office and he commanded a battalion in the line at 'Plugstreet' in Flanders early in 1916.

Part II of Volume III starts with the invitation of the Prime Minister (David Lloyd George) to rejoin the government on 16 July 1917 as either the Ministry of Munitions (which he chose) or the newly created Air Ministry. He says that to the end of 1915 the resources of Britain exceeded the ability to use them; megalomania was a virtue and so was adding one or two noughts to orders. By now, after three years (twenty months) the island was an arsenal with the new national factories beginning to function. But the fighting fronts now absorbed all the production. The Admiralty had not been affected by the Shell Crisis of 1915, and Admiralty requirements had priority. France and Italy also had entitlements. The chapters on the fighting fronts start with victory over the U-boats, then the need to save Italy from collapse after the Battle of Caporetto. On the Western Front, Passchendaele, Operation Michael, the Turn of the Tide, the "Teutonic Collapse" and "Victory". He ends with "Will a new generation in their turn be immolated to square the black accounts of Teuton and Gaul? Will our children bleed and gasp again in devastated lands? Or will there spring from the very fires of conflict that reconciliation of the three giant combatants, which would unite their genius and secure to each in safety and freedom a share in rebuilding the glory of Europe?"

This volume was originally published in two parts. In subsequent editions these were labelled as Volumes III and IV, so that the original structure of five volumes in six physical books became six volumes.

=== Volume IV: The Aftermath 1918–1922 (published 1929) ===
The Preface says it is mainly concerned with reactions outside the Peace Conference in the "halls of Paris and Versailles" though there are chapters on the conference, the League of Nations and the Peace Treaties. Churchill indicts the Treaty of Versailles as being too harsh and predicts it will cause future problems.

Churchill points out that he went to Paris to discuss Russia not to attend the Peace Conference, though he asked US President Woodrow Wilson for a decision on the Russian item when it came up, rather than a continuation of "aimless unorganised bloodshed" until Wilson returned. There are chapters on Russia, Poland, Ireland, Greece and Turkey, with an Appendix on the Cairo Conference, Iraq, and "the Pacification of the Middle East". He denies the claim by Wilson’s assistant Ray Stannard Baker that he was "the most militaristic of British leaders" and "an opponent of the League" (of Nations). Rhodes comments that The Aftermath contains "the most ferocious denunciations of (Bolshevik) Russia: ... poisoned ... infected ... a plague-bearing Russia ... armed hordes".

=== Volume V: The Eastern Front (published 1931) ===
The last volume to be published tells (according to the preface) of the conflict between Russia and the two Teutonic empires and the agonies of Central Europe, arising in Vienna. The struggle starts with Bosnia, the murder of the Archduke and the House of Habsburg; and ends with the ruin of all three houses: Romanov, Habsburg and Hohenzollern. After the Bolshevik Revolution of 1917 Russia withdraws from the war.

=== Abridged versions ===
An abridged and revised edition with an additional chapter on the Battle of the Marne and an introduction by Churchill dated 1 July 1930 was published in 1931 by Thornton Butterworth. Clementine Churchill on tour was told by a Singapore bookshop that sales of the abridged edition had "gone very well". The Daily Herald distributed a cheap two-volume edition printed by Odhams for 3/9d "a miracle of mass production" (so) "for the first time the working people would hear my side of the (Gallipoli) tale" but it did not sell. The hoped-for sales of 150,000 copies would have returned over £1000 in royalties. In 2005 an abridgement with an introduction by Martin Gilbert was published by the Free Press, New York.

== The reception of The World Crisis ==
Reaction was generally favourable, with T. E. Lawrence saying the second volume was "far and away the best war-book I’ve yet read" and John Maynard Keynes wrote after reading the fourth volume of his gratitude, admiration and envy. Malcolm Muggeridge and Lytton Strachey criticised the concentration on public lives rather than Strachey’s interest in motivation and private lives.

Several military writers in magazine articles criticized some of the opinions and statistics in Volume III. The essays "quarreling with some of his statistics and minor points of strategy and tactics" were reprinted in a book in 1927. The book introduction said that they "go far to destroy any claims Volume III of The World Crisis may have to historical value" although they "didn’t amount to much" according to Manchester.

By 1930 his account in the first three volumes (1923–29) "had been vigorously criticised, but this formidable, brilliant masterpiece had played an important part in the revaluation of his actions (with) the revelation of Churchill’s part in the origin of the tank, and the narrowness of the margin between triumph and disaster at the Dardanelles evoked some new evaluations."

== The writing of The World Crisis ==
The World Crisis began as a response to Lord Esher's attack on his actions in 1914 in his book "The Tragedy of Lord Kitchener", charging that "Churchill had slipped away to Belgium on his own while Kitchener was asleep". But they soon broadened out into a general multi-volume history. The volumes are a mix of military history, written with Churchill's usual narrative flair, diplomatic and political history, portraits of other political and military figures, and personal memoir, written in a colourful manner.

Churchill was a prolific writer, particularly (as he did not have a private income) when out of Parliament (1922–24), or out of office so needed to supplement a backbench MPs salary. The Churchills literally "lived from book to book, and from one article to the next". In his two years out of parliament he edited collections of his speeches and earned £13,200 from 33 articles in magazines: the Empire Review, Pearson’s Magazine, the Daily Chronicle, the Strand Magazine, Nash’s Pall Mall, English Life, the Sunday Chronicle, John Bull, the Weekly Despatch, the Daily Mail and Cosmopolitan in America.

The British editions of The World Crisis sold 80,551 copies, and brought him £58,846 from royalties which were between 30% and 33%. He purchased his house "Chartwell" in 1922 from £20,000 of The World Crisis royalties and a small legacy from a cousin Lord Herbert Vane-Tempest. "Chartwell" was purchased for £5,000, but with dry rot the rebuilding cost £18,000. The American edition of The World Crisis earned him $20,633.10 after deducting Curtis Brown’s commissions. Manchester said he wrote "superb copy" hence was one of the world’s most highly paid writers. In 1931 his writing income was £33,500. The Times serialised four of the five volumes of The World Crisis, and excerpts also appeared in the Sunday Chronicle.

In 1923 he noted to his wife "I have 8 articles to write as soon as the book is finished: £500 £400 & £200. We shall not starve"; it was not to be finished for eight more years, and ran to five thick volumes (with Volume III published in two parts) and 2,517 pages. The last three volumes were produced while he was a busy cabinet minister. He originally conceived of a two-volume work of his years in the Admiralty, saying in a 1915 letter to Clementine "Someday I shd like the truth to be known". He had filed memos, documents and letters, and in 1920 had them set in type by Sir Frederick Macmillan, so that they were readily usable and could be pasted onto large sheets of paper with written comments and transition sections added. He had Admiral Henry Jackson check his facts and Eddie Marsh his grammar and spelling. Desmond Morton assisted from 1929. Later in the 1930s his assistants included John Wheldon, Maurice Ashley and William Deakin. However, despite the checking by Admiral Jackson, the evidence indicates that Churchill "initiated the Dardanelles project, and pushed it forward with vigour, overruling or ignoring the doubts and criticisms of his service advisors. This course of action may have been justified, but it was a very different course to that described in The World Crisis".

== Churchill in the First World War and its aftermath ==
Churchill was First Lord of the Admiralty from October 1911 to May 1915. From May 1915, he had the sinecure of Chancellor of the Duchy of Lancaster and so was in the Cabinet and on the Dardanelles Committee. In November 1915, he resigned from the government. Until June 1916, he was on active service on the Western Front as a major and then as a lieutenant-colonel. He then resumed his active political career in the House of Commons but was not initially included in Lloyd George's Coalition Government in December 1916. From June 1917 to December 1918, he was Minister of Munitions but not a member of the small War Cabinet. From January 1919 to February 1921 (normal Cabinet Government having been resumed), he was Secretary of State for War and Air. He was involved in demobilization of the Army (1919), Intervention in Russia (1919) and the Irish crisis (1919-1919). For the remainder of Lloyd George's Coalition Government, until October 1922, he was Secretary of State for the Colonies. He was in government for the whole period, except in 1915 to 1917, and had taken notes and documents for his writing.

The three actions for which he was most criticised were the Defence of Antwerp in 1914, the Dardanelles campaign in 1915 and the intervention in Russia in 1919 and 1920.

Churchill had arrived in Antwerp on 3 October 1914, arriving in "undress Trinity House uniform". The Government had despatched the Royal Marine Brigade to Antwerp, arriving there on 4 October. Churchill had the 1st and 2nd Naval Brigades of the Royal Naval Division, which he had established, also sent there. They were mainly untrained naval recruits, and he was criticised when over 2,500 were interned or became casualties, but they had prolonged the defence of Antwerp for several days, perhaps a week, and they almost certainly enabled Dunkirk and Calais to be secured.

The Dardanelles campaign, which was originally to be a naval assault, and Intervention against the Bolshevist forces in Russia were both supported halfheartedly by Cabinet and the often-absent Prime Minister (Lloyd George in the latter case). Cabinet was reluctant to make a firm decision, and only minimal shipping was supplied for supplies to Russia, but more shipping was available. In both cases, a "single-minded man" was able to carry his views further than in more normal conditions.
