= Shall We All Commit Suicide? =

1924 essay by Winston Churchill

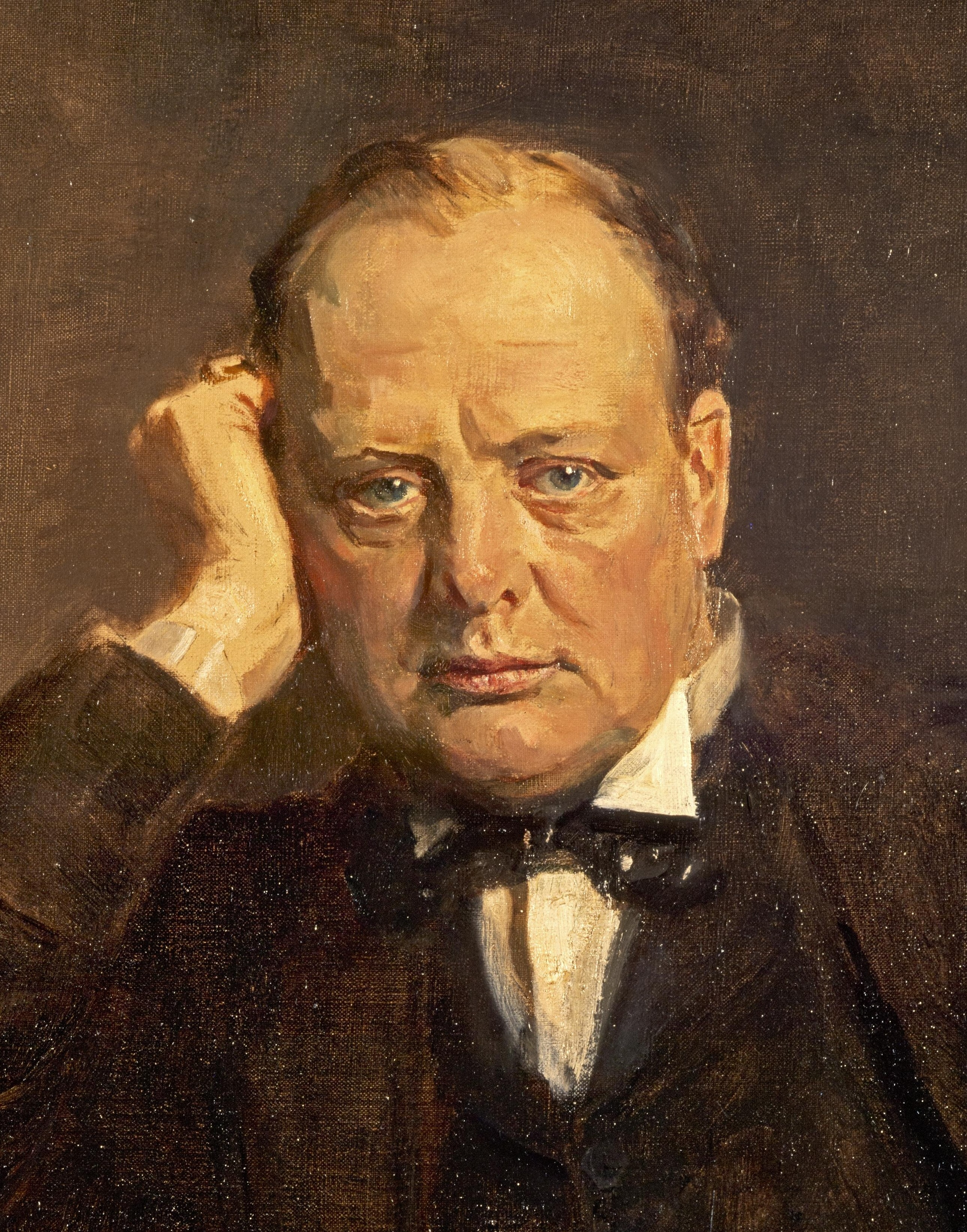
Churchill in the 1920s (or end of 1910s), painted by James Guthrie soon after World War I.

"Shall We All Commit Suicide?" is an essay about the inexorable development of technology written by Winston Churchill. It was originally published in The Pall Mall Magazine on 24 September 1924. It was republished in full in 'Thoughts and Adventures' in 1932.

In the essay, Churchill says that technology was advancing faster than humans could learn to protect themselves from its use for war and domination. With World War I having ended a few years before, he focuses on the potential damage in a future war, speculating on technological advancements that might result in "a bomb no bigger than an orange" that could "blast a township at a stroke".

His reference to a future atomic bomb may have been inspired by the science-fiction writings of H. G. Wells.

== Related works ==
He published two other essays on broad societal themes around the same time. The essay "Mass Effects in Modern Life" decried the connection between mass production and Bolshevism. The essay "Fifty Years Hence" predicted the rise of totalitarian fascist states that valued power more than intelligence and intelligence far more than morality.

== See also ==
- Winston Churchill as a writer
