= The Collected Works of Sir Winston Churchill =

The Collected Works of Sir Winston Churchill is a set of thirty-four volumes that were published in 1973, edited by Frederick Woods.

The collection was criticized for its high price, initially set at £945 and then raised to £1,060 (equivalent to £13,651 or US$16,967 in 2023).

== See also ==
- Winston Churchill as a writer
