= Great Contemporaries =

1937 collection of essays by Winston Churchill

- Author: Winston Churchill
- Language: English
- Subject: short biographies
- Genre: Military history, Biography
- Publisher: Thornton Butterworth Ltd (1937). Odhams Press Ltd (1947).
- Publication date: 1937
- Publication place: United Kingdom
- Media type: hardcover
- Pages: 307

Great Contemporaries is a collection of 25 short biographical essays about famous people, written by Winston Churchill.

The original collection was published in 1937 and included 21 essays mainly written between 1928 and 1931. Four were added to the book in the 1939 edition, about Lord Fisher, Charles Stewart Parnell, Lord Baden-Powell and Franklin D. Roosevelt. In 1941 the essays on Boris Savinkov and Leon Trotsky were removed from editions published at that time, since they had been opponents of Joseph Stalin, who as leader of Soviet Union was now an ally of Britain against Germany in World War II, and the article on Roosevelt was removed in 1942 when America also became an ally of Britain with Roosevelt as president. The Odhams edition of 1947 reinstated the three essays after the war.

Other subjects of the essays were Earl of Rosebery, Kaiser Wilhelm II, George Bernard Shaw, Joseph Chamberlain, Sir John French, John Morley, Hindenburg, H. H. Asquith, Lawrence of Arabia, the Earl of Birkenhead, Marshal Foch, Alfonso XIII, Douglas Haig, Arthur James Balfour, Adolf Hitler, George Nathaniel Curzon, Philip Snowden, Georges Clemenceau, and George V.
