= A History of the English-Speaking Peoples =

History by Winston Churchill

- First editions of the four volumes published 1956–1958 by Cassell
- Author: Winston Churchill
- Publisher: Cassell
- Publication date: 1956–1958
- Media type: Print
- Dewey Decimal: 942
- LC Class: DA16

A History of the English-Speaking Peoples is a four-volume history of Britain and its former colonies and possessions throughout the world, written by Winston Churchill, covering the period from Caesar's invasions of Britain (55 BC) to the end of the Second Boer War (1902). It was started in 1937 and finally published 1956–1958, delayed several times by war and his work on other texts. The volumes have been abridged into a single-volume, concise edition.

== Writing and publishing ==
Churchill, who excelled in the study of history as a child and whose mother was an American, had a firm belief in a so-called "Special Relationship" between the people of Britain and its Commonwealth (Australia, Canada, New Zealand, etc.) united under the Crown, and the people of the United States who had broken with the Crown and gone their own way. His book thus dealt with the resulting two divisions of the "English-speaking peoples".

At the independent suggestions of British publisher Newman Flower and American editor Maxwell Perkins, Churchill began the history in the 1930s, during the period that his official biographer Martin Gilbert termed the "wilderness years" when he was not in government. Work was interrupted in 1939 when the Second World War broke out and Churchill was appointed First Lord of the Admiralty and became Prime Minister a year later. After the war ended in 1945, Churchill was busy, first writing his history of that conflict and then as Prime Minister again between 1951 and 1955, so it was not until the mid-1950s, when Churchill was in his early eighties, that he was able to finish his work.

One third of the last volume was devoted to the military minutiae of the American Civil War. Social history, the agricultural revolution, and the Industrial Revolution hardly get a mention. Political opponent Clement Attlee suggested the work should have been titled "Things in history that interested me."

Despite these criticisms, the books were bestsellers and reviewed favourably on both sides of the Atlantic. In The Daily Telegraph, J. H. Plumb wrote: "This history will endure; not only because Sir Winston has written it, but also because of its own inherent virtues — its narrative power, its fine judgment of war and politics, of soldiers and statesmen, and even more because it reflects a tradition of what Englishmen in the hey-day of their empire thought and felt about their country's past."

The four volumes are:

- The Birth of Britain
- The New World
- The Age of Revolution
- The Great Democracies

=== Related works ===
The BBC produced a series of twenty-six fifty-minute plays loosely based around Churchill's work and entitled Churchill's People which were broadcast in 1974 and 1975. However, the quality of the productions was judged to be poor and the series received low ratings.

A sequel to Churchill's work, A History of the English-Speaking Peoples Since 1900, by Andrew Roberts, was published in 2006.

== See also ==
- Churchill's People
- Anglo-Saxons
- Anglo-Saxons (ethnic slur)
- White Anglo-Saxon Protestants
- Anglosphere
- Greater Britain
- Winston Churchill as historian
- Winston Churchill as writer
