= Marlborough: His Life and Times =

Book by Winston Churchill

- Title page for Marlborough: His Life and Times (1933)
- Author: Winston Churchill
- Language: English
- Subject: John Churchill, 1st Duke of Marlborough
- Genre: Non-fiction
- Publisher: George G. Harrap
- Publication date: 1933; 1934; 1936; 1938
- Publication place: United Kingdom

Marlborough: His Life and Times is a panegyric biography written by Winston Churchill about John Churchill, 1st Duke of Marlborough. Churchill was a lineal descendant of the duke. The book comprises four volumes, the first of which appeared in October 1933 (557 pages, 200,000 words) with subsequent volumes in 1934, 1936 and 1938. The publisher was George G. Harrap, who in 1929 agreed an advance of £10,000 for the publishing rights, topping the offer made by Churchill's customary publishers, Thornton Butterworth. American publisher Scribner's paid a £5,000 advance for the United States publishing rights. At that time Churchill envisaged writing between 180,000 and 250,000 words, to be published in no more than two volumes. Cumulative sales of the first volume were 17,000 copies, 15,000 for the second and 10,000 for the third and fourth, which was a respectable though not exceptional performance for such a work.

The historian J. R. Jones stated that Churchill, by studying Marlborough's career and reasons for his success, helped equip him for his role as Prime Minister from 1940 onwards. It is also said that the books are "unique in defence literature - for rarely has a future national leader in wartime revealed so much about his approach to war and politics as Churchill did in those works."

== Background ==
Churchill had conceived the idea of writing the book by 1929, when the Conservative defeat in the general election meant that he was no longer a government minister, so that he lost his ministerial salary and gained spare time. His first act in preparing the book was to employ Maurice Ashley part-time for a salary of £300 per year to carry out research about Marlborough. Ashley later produced his own biography of Marlborough, in 1939. Churchill, with other assistants, worked on and published a number of different historical books while work on Marlborough was proceeding. Churchill turned seriously to writing Marlborough after Easter 1932, following pressure from his publishers. His initial draft was passed to Edward Marsh, who had been his private secretary while a government minister, with instructions to look out for repetitions, boring passages or clumsy sentences. He wrote over 300 letters requesting information or opinions about the work in progress.

== Content ==
In the preface to volume one, Churchill writes "It is my hope to recall this great shade from the past, and not only invest him with his panoply, but make him living and intimate to modern eyes."

Churchill was sceptical of the claim that Marlborough had, at 17 or 18 years of age, become the lover of the King's mistress, the Duchess of Cleveland, but accepted that he did so somewhat later, at 20. In 1675, however, Marlborough met the 15-year-old Sarah Jennings, married her, and lived with her contentedly for the remainder of his life. They were of comparable social status, but neither had any significant money. Churchill saw similarities between his ancestor and himself.

== Critical review ==
A review of the book was provided by Roy Jenkins in his biography of Churchill. He described it as "a revelation", at least to someone "under educated in late-Stuart history" such as himself. He felt the first chapter was a somewhat dull description of Marlborough's ancestors, but the remainder was an exhilarating description of the English Restoration and Europe in the time of Charles II. Churchill was at some pains to refute the poor impression of Marlborough made by Thomas Babington Macaulay 100 years earlier in his history of that period. Macaulay had criticised Marlborough's switch of loyalty from Charles II to William of Orange and his later dealings with the exiled James II. However, Jenkins notes a similar tendency for Churchill in his turn to be excessively critical of Louis XIV.

American political philosopher Leo Strauss was particularly impressed by this book, stating in 1965 after hearing of the death of Churchill: "Not a whit less important than his deeds and speeches are his writings, above all his Marlborough—the greatest historical work written in our century, an inexhaustible mine of political wisdom and understanding, which should be required reading for every student of political science."

== Sources ==
- Churchill, Winston. Marlborough: His Life and Times, Bk. 1, vols. i & ii. University of Chicago Press (2002). ISBN 0-226-10633-0
- Churchill, Winston. Marlborough: His Life and Times, Bk. 2, vols. iii & iv. University of Chicago Press (2002). ISBN 0-226-10635-7
- Macaulay, Thomas. The History of England (abridged). Penguin Books (1968). ISBN 0-14-043133-0
