= The River War =

1899 book by Winston Churchill

The River War: An Historical Account of the Reconquest of the Soudan
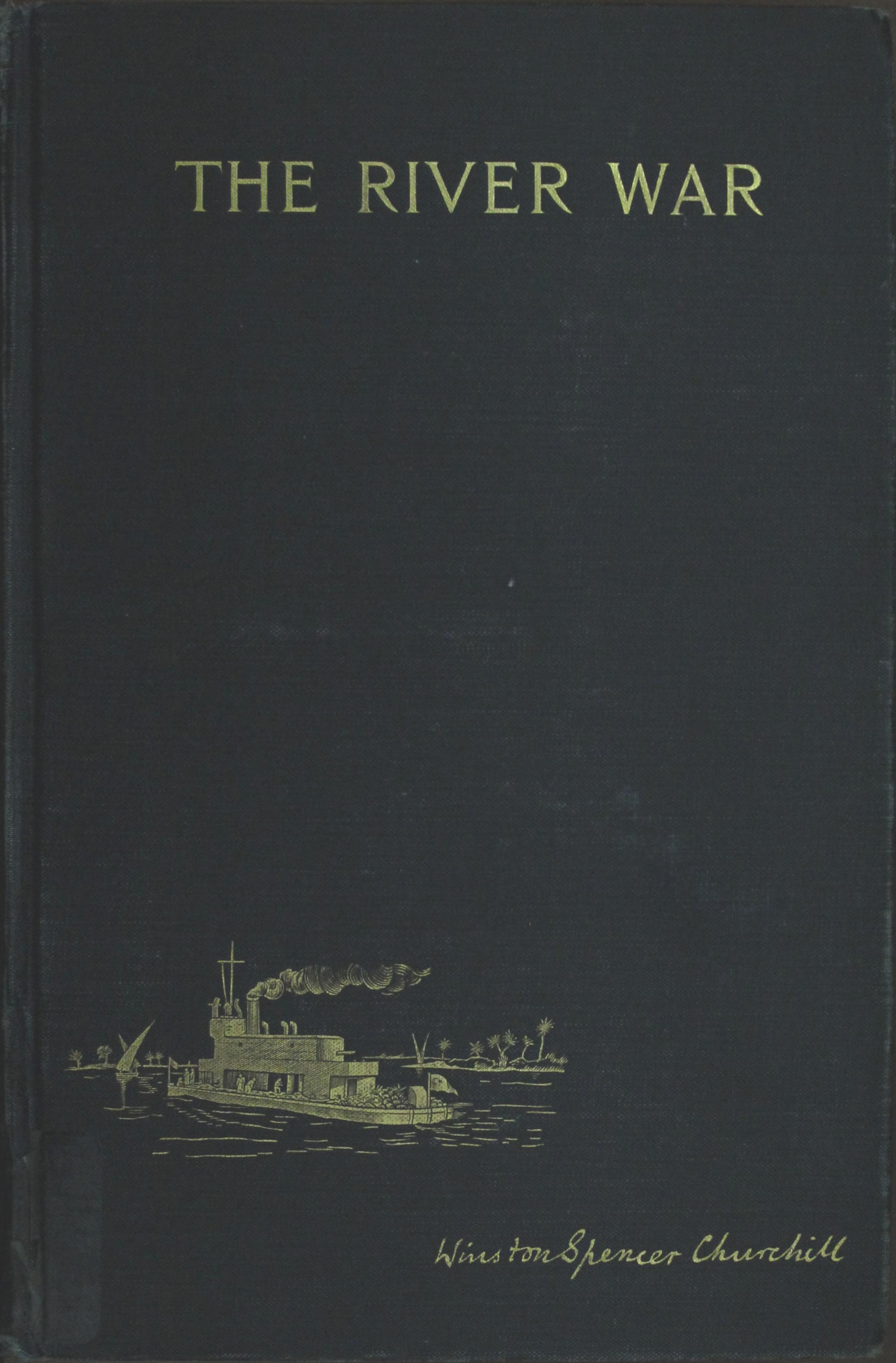
- Author: Winston Churchill
- Illustrator: Angus McNeill
- Language: English
- Subject: conquest of Sudan (1896–1899)
- Genre: Military history
- Publisher: Longmans, Green and Co.
- Publication date: 1899
- Publication place: United Kingdom
- Media type: Hardcover
- Pages: 400
- OCLC: 2704682
- LC Class: DT108.5 .C56 1899

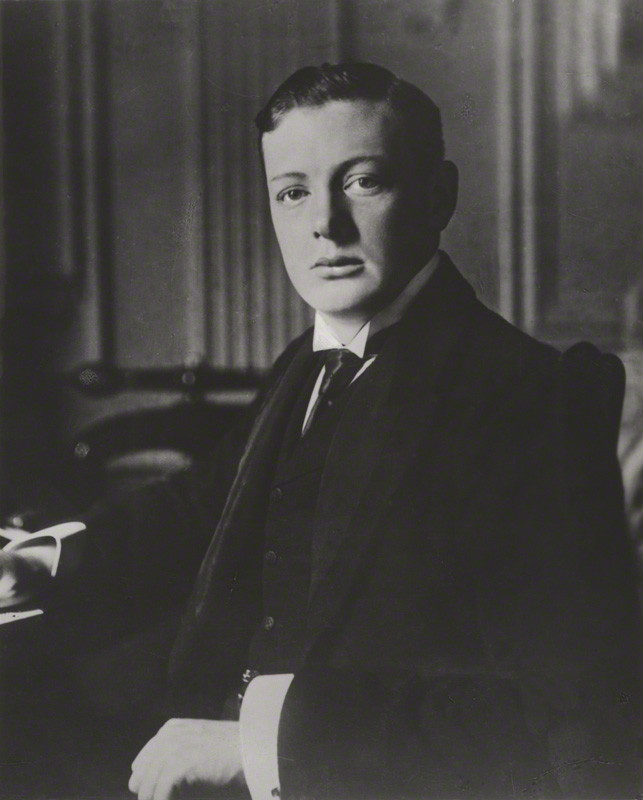
Winston Churchill, 1899

The River War: An Historical Account of the Reconquest of the Soudan (1899), by Winston Churchill, is a history of the conquest of the Sudan between 1896 and 1899 by Anglo-Egyptian forces led by Lord Kitchener. He defeated the Sudanese Dervish forces, led by Khalifa Abdallahi ibn Muhammad, heir to the self-proclaimed Mahdi Muhammad Ahmad, who had vowed to conquer Egypt and drive out the Ottomans. The first, two-volume, edition includes accounts of Churchill's own experiences as a British Army officer during the war, and his views on its conduct.

The River War was Churchill's second published book after The Story of the Malakand Field Force, and originally filled two volumes with over 1,000 pages in 1899. The River War was subsequently abridged to one volume in 1902.

== Background ==
Aware that there was a war in Sudan, Churchill was determined to be part of it. He was not alone in this, because in a time that was largely peaceful, many British Army officers wanted experience of battle to further their careers. In Churchill's case, he did not see his career as lying with the army, but had already started writing about wars and wanted a new campaign to write about. He first attempted to obtain a transfer from his regiment stationed in India to the 21st Lancers, which was the unit taking part in the war. This was granted by the War Office, but was rejected by the commander of the British force in Sudan, General Kitchener. Churchill next took leave to Britain, where he enlisted friends and family to lobby Kitchener to permit him to take part. This continued to be unsuccessful, even when the prime minister Lord Salisbury made an inquiry on his behalf. Eventually, however, his mother's friend Lady Jeune got him what he wanted; she approached her friend Sir Evelyn Wood, Adjutant General of the Horse Guards, who had authority over appointments to the regiment in England, and within two days he received an attachment to the Lancers in place of an officer who had died, on 24 July 1898. On 5 August he was in Luxor and on 24 August the regiment set out from Atbara to attack the Mahdist forces.

Before leaving London, Churchill obtained a commission to write accounts of the war for the Morning Post, producing 15 articles, which were printed in the newspaper between 23 September and 8 October 1898, for which he was paid £15 (equivalent to £1,686 in 2025) per article. This helped offset his expenses for the trip; the War Office had declined to meet them, and also refused any liability should he be killed or injured. The Times had two correspondents covering the war, one of whom was killed and another injured, and Churchill wrote a piece for this newspaper also, but Kitchener vetoed the sending of the report.

After the Battle of Omdurman the Lancers were ordered to return to other duties, so Churchill's personal experience of the war ceased at that point. Although Omdurman had been taken from Khalifa Abdullahi, the Khalifa himself escaped and was not tracked down and found to have been killed in the final defeat of his army for another year. A number of participants later played important parts in the First World War. Aside from Churchill and Kitchener, captains Douglas Haig and Henry Rawlinson became generals in the war, while Lieutenant David Beatty, then commanding a Nile gunboat, became an admiral and commanded the British Grand Fleet.

Churchill returned to England to complete his leave, before returning to India for three months and finally resigning from the army. As a direct result of Churchill's writings, a rule was introduced prohibiting serving officers from also acting as war correspondents. This was one factor contributing to his leaving the army, since his earnings from writing were some five times greater than his army pay during his three years of army service.

In India Churchill visited the viceroy, Lord Curzon, who had himself written a history of "Persia and the Persian Question" eight years before. He read everything he could find containing background information about the Sudan. On the way home he stopped for two weeks in Egypt to visit Lord Cromer, then in charge of the Egyptian government, who read through the text and made suggestions and corrections, in particular playing down the popular impression of General Gordon, murdered by the Mahdi's forces fourteen years before, as a hero. While in Cairo he spoke to Slatin Pasha, author of a work about the Sudan, Sir Reginald Wingate, Director of Intelligence on Kitchener's staff, Edouard Girouard, responsible for building railways through Egypt which allowed the British advance, and others who had played some part. Sailing home across the Mediterranean, Churchill had as a fellow passenger George Warrington Steevens, who was also a war correspondent, working for the Daily Telegraph. They had met on a couple of previous occasions, and Churchill prevailed upon him also to read the manuscript. His suggestion was to reduce the degree of philosophising that, despite the accuracy of Churchill's commentary, might bore the reader.

== Content ==
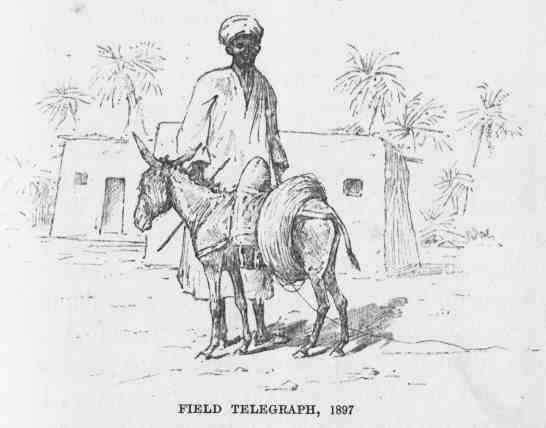
Illustrations by Angus McNeill, here showing how cable for the railway telegraph was carried and laid

In vivid style the book describes the background to the war, the relationship of the Upper Nile to Egypt, the killing of General Charles George Gordon in the siege at Khartoum, the political reaction in England, and Kitchener's elaborate preparations for the war. While in the Sudan, Churchill fought in the Battle of Omdurman. Churchill comments at length on the mechanisation of war with use of the telegraph, railroad, and a new generation of weaponry.

=== 1899 unabridged, two-volume edition ===
The unabridged version contains many illustrations with drawings, photogravures, and coloured maps. It also contains vivid narratives of personal adventures of the author, his views on British expansionism, passages of deep reflection about the requirements of a civilised government, and criticism of military and political leaders and religion. The first edition was reviewed by The Times, which described it as containing material sufficient for two good books and one bad one, with the bad one being the more interesting.

About Islam he wrote:

How dreadful are the curses which Mohammedanism lays on its votaries! Besides the fanatical frenzy, which is as dangerous in a man as hydrophobia in a dog, there is this fearful fatalistic apathy. The effects are apparent in many countries. Improvident habits, slovenly systems of agriculture, sluggish methods of commerce, and insecurity of property exist wherever the followers of the Prophet rule or live. A degraded sensualism deprives this life of its grace and refinement; the next of its dignity and sanctity. The fact that in Mohammedan law every woman must belong to some man as his absolute property – either as a child, a wife, or a concubine – must delay the final extinction of slavery until the faith of Islam has ceased to be a great power among men. Individual Moslems may show splendid qualities. Thousands become the brave and loyal soldiers of the Queen: all know how to die: but the influence of the religion paralyses the social development of those who follow it. No stronger retrograde force exists in the world. Far from being moribund, Mohammedanism is a militant and proselytizing faith. It has already spread throughout Central Africa, raising fearless warriors at every step; and were it not that Christianity is sheltered in the strong arms of science, the science against which it had vainly struggled, the civilisation of modern Europe might fall, as fell the civilisation of ancient Rome.

About the British attitude to war:

...there are many people in England, and perhaps elsewhere, who seem to be unable to contemplate military operations for clear political objects, unless they can cajole themselves into the belief that their enemy are utterly and hopelessly vile. To this end the Dervishes, from the Mahdi and the Khalifa downwards, have been loaded with every variety of abuse and charged with all conceivable crimes. This may be very comforting to philanthropic persons at home; but when an army in the field becomes imbued with the idea that the enemy are vermin who cumber the earth, instances of barbarity may easily be the outcome. This unmeasured condemnation is moreover as unjust as it is dangerous and unnecessary.... We are told that the British and Egyptian armies entered Omdurman to free the people from the Khalifa's yoke. Never were rescuers more unwelcome.

About the modern machinery of war and its effectiveness against native tribesmen:

...the Maxim guns [an early machine gun] had also come into action. A dozen Dervishes are standing on a sandy knoll. All in a moment the dust began to jump in front of them, and then the clump of horsemen melts into a jumble on the ground, and a couple of scared survivors scurry to cover. Yet even then a few brave men come back to help their fallen comrades.

Churchill spread his criticisms wherever he found fault. A passage was highly critical of General Kitchener for ordering the desecration of the Mahdi's tomb and carrying off his head as a trophy. The head was returned by the order of Lord Cromer, once he discovered what had happened. The matter was debated in parliament and led to a newspaper campaign against Kitchener as well as deepening the ill feeling which already existed between Kitchener and Churchill (First Lord of the Admiralty from 1911), who as members of the British government in 1914 were expected to co-operate militarily as heads of the army and navy departments. All reference to the incident was removed from the second edition.

Criticisms extended to the supplies for the troops: British soldiers were sent out from England with boots made substantially from cardboard, which rapidly disintegrated and had to be bound with cloth or string to hold together. While the Indian Army was equipped with highly effective dum-dum bullets produced in India, British bullets sent to Egypt were simply pointed, and 1,000,000 rounds had to have their ends filed off to increase their effectiveness. The rough remodelling made the bullets inaccurate at long ranges, giving soldiers a choice of bullets able to hit their target but only wound, or killing bullets which were likely to miss and could jam the guns. Railway engines needed to carry troops and supplies into Sudan had to be obtained from all over the world, since British companies were unable to supply them at short notice. By contrast, American companies could supply locomotives immediately which were more effective and cheaper than some obtained from England.

=== 1902 abridged, one-volume edition ===
In 1902 Churchill had become a member of parliament. It was thought that the commentary about some of the people mentioned had better be excised in a revised edition; about a third of the book was removed in an edit down to a single volume.

Much of the removed content included passages in which Churchill recounted his own experiences, as he had done in other works, such as The Story of the Malakand Field Force. This removal gave the revised book a somewhat different feel to these others, and to its original form. Other removals included discussions on the ethics of warfare, Churchill's own opinions of events, and his assessment of Islam. The revised book was described as an authoritative history of the war.

Further abridged editions were published numerous times over the twentieth century, with increasing excisions.

A "definitive" new edition of the book, restoring it to the original two-volume text, edited and annotated by Professor James W. Muller, was published in April 2021.

== Controversial modern political usage ==
In the US in May 2013, Missouri State Representative Rick Stream composed and forwarded an e-mail to his House GOP colleagues, alleging the "dangers of Islam" and quoting Churchill's controversial statements. The Riverfront Times called the e-mail "bizarre."

Also in May 2013, the Winston-Salem Journal published a commentary by columnist Cal Thomas, in which he criticized United Kingdom Prime Minister David Cameron for his reaction following the killing of a British soldier in London, and invited him to take notice of Winston Churchill's views on Islam, some expressed in The River War.

In April 2014, Paul Weston, chairman of the far right Liberty GB party, was arrested in Winchester, Hampshire, for reading aloud passages from the book whilst standing on the steps of the Guildhall and not dispersing when ordered to do so. Weston, a candidate in the May 2014 European Elections, was quoting from a section of Churchill's book that described Islamic culture in unflattering terms.

== Modern criticism ==
Johann Hari criticized Winston Churchill's views in his Not his finest hour: The dark side of Winston Churchill. The author also emphasizes the significance of Richard Toye's Churchill's Empire.

In Winston's War, author Max Hastings says: "Churchill's view of the British Empire and its peoples was unenlightened by comparison with that of America's president [Franklin Roosevelt], or even by the standards of his time."

Paul Rahe argues that reading The River War is suitable for "an age when the Great Democracies are likely to be called on to respond to ugly little conflicts marked by social, sectarian, and tribal rivalries in odd corners of the world—the Arabian peninsula, the Caucasus, the Horn of Africa, the Balkans, Central Africa, the Maghreb, and the Caribbean, to mention the most recent examples—I can think of no other historical work that better deserves our attention than The River War."
