= Macmillan's Magazine =

Macmillan's Magazine was a monthly British magazine published 1859 to 1907 by Alexander Macmillan.

The magazine was a literary periodical that published fiction and non-fiction works primarily by British authors. Thomas Hughes convinced Macmillan to found the magazine, and its first editor was David Masson.

In 1868, David Masson resigned as editor of the magazine and left London to become Professor of English Literature at the University of Edinburgh. Alexander Macmillan appointed George Grove, who remained in this post for 15 years, becoming also a general literary adviser to the publisher.

In the magazine's first decade of publication, Frederick Denison Maurice was a prolific contributor.
