= Deaths in September 1995 =

The following is a list of notable deaths in September 1995.

Entries for each day are listed alphabetically by surname. A typical entry lists information in the following sequence:

- Name, age, country of citizenship at birth, subsequent country of citizenship (if applicable), reason for notability, cause of death (if known), and reference.

== September 1995 ==
=== 1 ===
- Sylvia Gytha de Lancey Chapman, 98, New Zealand doctor and welfare worker.
- María de la Cruz, 82, Chilean political activist, journalist, writer, and political commentator.
- Joseph N. Gallo, 83, American mobster and member of the Gambino crime family.
- Wilhelm Sold, 84, German football player and Olympian (1936).
- Gino Sopracordevole, 90, Italian rower and Olympian (1924).
- Benay Venuta, 85, American actress, singer, and dancer, lung cancer.

=== 2 ===
- Simona Arghir-Sandu, 46, Romanian Olympic handballer (1976), cancer.
- Don Gibson, 87, Australian rules footballer.
- Bahri Guiga, 91, Tunisian lawyer and politician.
- Lenie Lanting-Keller, 70, Dutch Olympic diver (1952).
- Václav Neumann, 74, Czech conductor, violinist, and opera director.
- Earl T. Newbry, 95, American businessman and politician.
- Joseph O'Keefe, 86, Canadian politician, member of the House of Commons of Canada (1963-1968).

=== 3 ===
- Lance Adams-Schneider, 75, New Zealand politician.
- Mary Adshead, 91, British painter, muralist, illustrator and designer, heart failure.
- Earle Birney, 91, Canadian poet and novelist.
- Mort Browne, 87, Australian rules footballer.
- D. C. Coleman, 75, British economic historian.
- Parker Morton, 83, Australian rules football player and coach.
- Ricardo Sánchez, 54, American poet, cancer.
- Louis van Biljon, 68, South African Olympic sprinter (1952).

=== 4 ===
- Don Deeks, 72, American football player (Boston Yanks, Washington Redskins, Green Bay Packers).
- Paulo Gracindo, 84, Brazilian actor, prostate cancer.
- Chuck Greenberg, 45, American musician (Shadowfax), heart attack.
- Edmond Jouhaud, 90, French general involved in the Algiers putsch of 1961.
- William Kunstler, 76, American lawyer and civil rights activist.
- Fabio Pittorru, 66, Italian novelist, screenwriter, journalist and film director.
- Roman Zvonkov, 28, Ukrainian biathlete and Olympian (1994).

=== 5 ===
- John Britten, 45, New Zealand mechanical engineer, cancer.
- Tom Chisari, 72, American football coach.
- Salil Chowdhury, 69, Indian songwriter, lyricist, writer, and poet.
- Girija, 57, Indian actress.
- Vinko Golob, 74, Bosnian-Herzegovinian football player.
- Paul Julian, 81, American background animator, sound effects artist and voice actor.
- Eny Karim, 84, Indonesian politician and civil servant.
- Ahmed Koulamallah, 83, Chadian politician.
- John Megna, 42, American actor, director and educator, AIDS-related complications.
- Ante Nardelli, 58, Croatian water polo player and Olympian (1960, 1964).
- Bob O'Shaughnessy, 74, American basketball player (Syracuse Nationals).
- Jean-Luc Pépin, 70, Canadian academic, and politician.
- Francis Showering, 83, English brewer, heart attack.
- Zulu Sofola, 60, Nigerian playwright and dramatist.
- Benyamin Sueb, 56, Indonesian actor, comedian and singer.
- Karl Warner, 87, American Olympic athlete (1932).
- Charles Willoughby, 101, Canadian politician, member of the House of Commons of Canada (1963-1965).

=== 6 ===
- Sergio Atzeni, 42, Italian writer, drowned.
- Michelangelo Borriello, 86, Italian Olympic sports shooter (1936, 1948, 1952, 1956).
- Gianni Caldana, 81, Italian Olympic track and field athlete (1936).
- Bill DeCorrevont, 76, American gridiron football player.
- Mary Doran, 84, American actress.
- Hugo Hollas, 49, American football player (New Orleans Saints, San Francisco 49ers).
- Warren Ingersoll, 87, American Olympic field hockey player (1932).
- Mo Lisby, 82, American baseball player.
- Buster Mathis, 52, American boxer, heart failure.
- Larry O'Connor, 78, Canadian Olympic hurdler (1936).
- Ralph Rosenblum, 69, American film editor (Annie Hall, The Producers, Fail-Safe).
- B. K. Thapar, 73, Indian archaeologist.

=== 7 ===
- John B. Calhoun, 78, American ethologist and behavioral researcher.
- Richard Guy Condon, 43, American anthropologist, disappeared on this date and is presumed dead.
- Henri Klein, 51, Luxembourgian footballer.
- Al Papai, 78, American Major League Baseball player.
- Michel Scob, 60, French Olympic cyclist (1960).

=== 8 ===
- Peter Baxandall, 74, English audio engineer and electronics engineer.
- Madge Biggs, 93, Falkland Islands librarian and politician.
- Paco Campos, 79, Spanish footballer.
- Eileen Chang, 74, Chinese-born American essayist, novelist, and screenwriter.
- Rose Chernin, 93, American communist and activist of Russian birth, Alzheimer's disease.
- José Luis González Dávila, 52, Mexican football player and Olympian (1964).
- Olga Ivinskaya, 83, Russian poet and writer, cancer.
- Safa Khulusi, 78, Iraqi historian, novelist, poet, journalist and broadcaster.
- Erich Kunz, 86, Austrian operatic bass baritone at the Vienna State Opera and Metropolitan Opera.
- Halldis Moren Vesaas, 87, Norwegian poet, translator and writer of children's books.
- Michael Nigg, 26, American waiter, homicide by gunshot wound.

=== 9 ===
- Ida Carroll, 89, British music educator, double bassist, and composer.
- Marina Núñez del Prado, 86, Bolivian sculptor.
- Reinhard Furrer, 54, German physicist and astronaut (STS-61-A), aircraft crash.
- Lin Houston, 74, American gridiron football player (Cleveland Browns).
- Benjamin Mazar, 89, Israeli historian.
- Erik Nilsson, 79, Swedish football player and Olympian (1948, 1952).
- Béla Pálfi, 72, Yugoslavian footballer and Olympian (1948).
- Akimitsu Takagi, 74, Japanese crime fiction writer, stroke.
- Ron Talsky, 60, American costume designer.
- Keith Wayne, 50, American actor (Night of the Living Dead), suicide.
- Jamie Whitten, 85, American politician and United States House of Representatives representative (1941-1995), heart failure.

=== 10 ===
- Harriet Bell, 72, American advocate for disability rights.
- Charles Denner, 69, French actor, cancer.
- Molly Hide, 81, English cricketer.
- Derek Meddings, 64, British special effects designer (Superman, Thunderbirds, Batman), Oscar winner (1979), colorectal cancer.
- Shoji Suzuki, 63, Japanese jazz clarinet player and band leader.

=== 11 ===
- Fred Campbell, 84, Australian politician and Queensland Legislative Assembly member.
- Georges Canguilhem, 91, French philosopher and physician.
- Bruno Eliasen, 62, Danish footballer.
- Anita Harding, 42, Irish-British neurologist, colorectal cancer.
- Roger W. Heyns, 77, American professor and academic.
- Charles J. Hitch, 85, American economist and Assistant Secretary of Defense.
- Peter McIntyre, 85, New Zealand painter and author.
- Kieth O'dor, 33, British racing driver, racing accident.
- Vladislav Strzhelchik, 74, Soviet/Russian actor, brain cancer.

=== 12 ===
- Lubomír Beneš, 59, Czech animator, director, and author.
- Johnny Bothwell, 76, American jazz alto saxophonist and bandleader.
- Jeremy Brett, 61, English actor (Sherlock Holmes, My Fair Lady, War and Peace), heart failure.
- Grahame Clark, 88, British archaeologist.
- Larry Gales, 59, American jazz double-bassist, leukemia.
- Tom Helmore, 91, English actor (Vertigo, The Time Machine, This Could Be the Night).
- Frederick Augustus Irving, 101, American Army officer.
- Katherine Locke, 85, American actress.
- Ernest Pohl, 62, Polish football player and Olympian (1960).
- Ponnuswami Sitaram, 63, Indian cricketer.
- Geoffrey Stokes, 55, American journalist and writer on music and sports, esophageal cancer.
- Ted Wood, 79, Australian rules footballer.

=== 13 ===
- Aluf Joseph Avidar, 89, Israeli statesman, author and ambassador.
- Fritz Bennewitz, 69, German theatre director.
- Eberhard Godt, 95, German naval officer.
- Francesco Messina, 94, Italian sculptor.
- Maheswar Neog, 80, Indian academic.
- Achille Piccini, 83, Italian football player and Olympian (1936).
- Harold Shepherdson, 76, English football player and coach.
- Frank Silva, 44, American set dresser and actor (Twin Peaks), AIDS-related complications.

=== 14 ===
- Leon Adams, 90, American journalist, publicist and historian.
- Maurice K. Goddard, 83, American cabinet officer for six governors, suicide.
- Emerson John Moore, 57, American prelate of the Roman Catholic Church.
- Eiji Okada, 75, Japanese actor (Hiroshima mon amour, The Ugly American), heart failure.
- Willy Olsen, 74, Norwegian footballer.
- Naomi Smith, 15, English schoolgirl.
- A. E. Wilder-Smith, 79, British organic chemist and young Earth creationist.

=== 15 ===
- Harry Calder, 94, English cricketer.
- Douglass Cater, 72, American journalist, political aide, and college president.
- Dirceu, 43, Brazilian football player and Olympian (1972), traffic collision.
- Dietrich Hrabak, 80, German fighter pilot during World War II.
- Sam McCluskie, 63, British trade unionist.
- David McMullin, 87, American field hockey player and Olympian (1932, 1936).
- Pedro Nolasco, 33, Dominican boxer and Olympian (1984), shot.
- Gunnar Nordahl, 73, Swedish footballer and Olympian (1948).
- Rien Poortvliet, 63, Dutch draughtsman and painter, bone cancer.
- Nap Reyes, 75, American Major League Baseball player (New York Giants).
- Gavin Smith, 47, Australian rules footballer.
- Michio Watanabe, 72, Japanese politician and Deputy Prime Minister of Japan, heart failure.

=== 16 ===
- Michael Balfour, 86, English historian and civil servant.
- Leo Horn, 79, Dutch football referee.
- Aldo Novarese, 75, Italian type designer.
- Harold Obunga, 35, Kenyan Olympic boxer (1988).
- Pierre Olaf, 67, French actor.
- Jack Wink, 73, American football player and coach.

=== 17 ===
- Gottfried Bermann, 98, German publisher.
- Catherine Cobb, 92, British jeweler and silversmith.
- Yehuda Getz, 70–71, Israeli rabbi of the Western Wall for 27 years, heart attack.
- Astrid Krebsbach, 82, German table tennis player.
- Helen Nearing, 91, American author and vegetarianism advocate, single-car accident.
- Friedrich Schütter, 74, German film and television actor.
- Rakel Seweriin, 89, Norwegian politician.
- Grady Sutton, 89, American actor.
- Lucien Victor, 64, Belgian cyclist and Olympian (1952).

=== 18 ===
- Doreen Cannon, 64, American teacher of acting at the Royal Academy of Dramatic Arts.
- Donald Davie, 73, English Movement poet, and literary critic.
- Jean Gol, 53, Belgian politician, cerebral hemorrhage.
- Kaka Hathrasi, 89, Hindi satirist and humorist poet of India.
- George S. Howard, 93, American conductor of The United States Air Force Band between 1947 and 1963.
- Tony Paulekas, 83, American gridiron football player (Green Bay Packers).
- Oleh Tverdokhlib, 25, Ukrainian track and field athlete and Olympian (1992), domestic accident.

=== 19 ===
- Mr. Bo, 63, American blues guitarist and singer, pneumonia.
- Melbourne Brindle, 90, Australian-American illustrator and painter.
- Walter Gross, 83, German-Israeli journalist who worked for Haaretz from 1949 through 1995.
- Rauf Hajiyev, 73, Soviet and Azerbaijani composer and politician.
- Mem Lovett, 83, American baseball player (Chicago White Sox).
- Sir Rudolf Peierls, 88, German-born British physicist.
- Orville Redenbacher, 88, American entrepreneur and businessman, heart attack.
- Clinton Stephens, 75, American badminton player.

=== 20 ===
- Charles Albanese, 58, American serial killer, execution by lethal injection.
- Emmy Albus, 83, German sprinter and Olympian (1936).
- Rene Anselmo, 69, American television executive.
- Mikhail Bogdanov, 80, Russian production designer and Academy Award nominee.
- Eulie Chowdhury, 71, Indian architect.
- Walter A. Haas Jr., 79, President and CEO (1958–1976) and Chairman (1970–1981) of Levi Strauss & Co.
- Monica Maurice, 87, British industrialist.
- Tokibayama Toshio, 51, Japanese sumo wrestler.
- René Zazzo, 84, French psychologist and pedagogue.

=== 21 ===
- Andy the Clown, 77, American clown associated with the Chicago White Sox.
- Tony Cuccinello, 87, American baseball player and coach.
- Delfy de Ortega, 75, Italian-Argentine actress, cancer.
- Alan Christopher Deere, 77, New Zealand fighter ace during World War ||.
- Frank Hall, 74, Irish broadcaster, journalist and film censor, heart attack.
- Harry Hurwitz, 57, American film director, screenwriter, actor and producer, heart attack.
- William Murray, 83, British educationist who created the Ladybird Peter and Jane books.
- Rudy Perpich, 67, American politician and Governor of Minnesota, colorectal cancer.
- Irven Spence, 86, American animator.
- Reg Twite, 84, Australian rules footballer.

=== 22 ===
- Julio Alejandro, 88, Spanish screenwriter.
- Eigil Axgil, 80, Danish gay rights activist.
- Dolly Collins, 62, English folk musician, arranger and composer.
- Raimondo Del Balzo, 56, Italian screenwriter and director, cancer.
- Albert Goodwin, 89, English historian.
- Phillip Ingle, 34, American murderer, execution by lethal injection.
- Bruno Junk, 65, Estonian race walker and Olympian (1952, 1956).
- Nasiha Kapidžić-Hadžić, 63, Bosnian children's author and poet.
- Antonio Pujol, 82, Mexican painter and printmaker.
- John Whitney, 78, American animator, composer and inventor.
- Claus Wunderlich, 73, German Olympic sailor (1952).

=== 23 ===
- Thomas Beck, 85, American film and stage actor, Alzheimer's disease.
- Carmen Bernos de Gasztold, 75, French poet.
- Fabien Galateau, 82, French road bicycle racer.
- Gerard Kuppen, 80, Dutch footballer.
- Abdelkrim Laribi, 51, Algerian football player.
- Booker T. Laury, 81, American boogie-woogie, blues, gospel and jazz pianist and singer, cancer.
- K. Thurairatnam, 65, Sri Lankan lawyer and politician.
- Joseph W. Tkach, 68, American evangelist and pastor of the Worldwide Church of God.
- Albrecht Unsöld, 90, German astrophysicist.

=== 24 ===
- Éric Borel, 16, French high school student and spree killer, suicide.
- Peter Butler, 94, New Zealand seaman, trade unionist, and local politician.
- Paula Dvorak, 82, Austrian film editor.
- Mac Hill, 70, Australian rules footballer.
- Keith Johnson, 66, Australian politician.
- Tom McBride, 42, American photographer, model, and actor, AIDS-related complications.
- Parvaz Mirza, 24, English cricketer.
- Antoine Schlindwein, 84, French Olympic gymnast (1936, 1948).
- Arthur Walsh, 72, Canadian actor and dancer.

=== 25 ===
- Dave Bowen, 67, Welsh football player, manager, and captain.
- Gustav Brom, 74, Czech big band leader, arranger, clarinetist and composer.
- Annie Elizabeth Delany, 104, American dentist and civil rights pioneer.
- Dorothy Dickson, 102, American actress and dancer on the London stage.
- Maryse Justin, 36, Mauritian long-distance runner and Olympian (1988), cancer.
- Dick Steinberg, 60, American football executive, stomach cancer.
- Kei Tomiyama, 56, Japanese actor, voice actor, and narrator, pancreatic cancer.

=== 26 ===
- Giancarlo Agazzi, 63, Italian ice hockey player and Olympian (1956, 1964).
- Flora Blanc, 78, American theatre school director and painter.
- Jack Broadstock, 74, Australian rules footballer.
- Xenia Cage, 82, American painter, sculptor, bookbinder, conservator, and musician.
- Lenny Hambro, 71, American jazz musician.
- Lynette Roberts, 86, Welsh poet and novelist.
- Kay Twomey, 81, American songwriter and music arranger.

=== 27 ===
- Baha Akşit, 81, Turkish physician and politician.
- Sasha Argov, 80, Israeli composer.
- Jean Arnot, 92, Australian women's rights activist, trade unionist, and librarian.
- Sean Conway, 64, Irish Fianna Fáil politician.
- Laurence Jones, 62, British Royal Air Force commander.
- Karl-Heinz Marbach, 78, German naval officer.
- Christopher Shaw, 71, British composer.
- Wilfried Soltau, 83, German Olympic canoeist (1952, 1956).
- Alison Steele, 58, American disk jockey known as 'Nightbird', stomach cancer.
- Jürgen Wattenberg, 94, German naval officer and U-boat commander during World War II.
- Hermann Zobel, 87, Danish Olympic equestrian (1956).

=== 28 ===
- Rabah Belamri, 48, Algerian writer, complications following surgery.
- Edgardo Coghlan, 66–67, Mexican painter.
- Al Cromwell, 57, Canadian blues and folk musician.
- Robert Curran, 72, Scottish nationalist political activist.
- Billy Elliot, 31, Northern Irish loyalist and paramilitary leader, shot.
- Olive Gibbs, 77, British politician and anti-nuclear weapons.
- Albert Johanneson, 55, South African football player.
- Aurelius Marie, 90, Dominican politician and jurist, cancer.
- Edmundo O'Gorman, 88, Mexican writer, historian and philosopher.
- Frederick N. Tebbe, 60, American chemist.

=== 29 ===
- Alfred Felix Landon Beeston, 84, English Orientalist.
- Gerd Bucerius, 89, German politician, publisher and journalist.
- Michael Carr, 62, English cricketer.
- James Downie, 73, New Zealand racing cyclist.
- Seger Ellis, 91, American jazz pianist and vocalist.
- Susan Fleetwood, 51, British actress, ovarian cancer.
- Francis Johnson, 84, British architect.
- Madalyn Murray O'Hair, 76, American activist, asphyxia.
- Kostas Papachristos, 79, Greek actor.
- Clarrie Riordan, 78, Australian rules footballer.

=== 30 ===
- Joe Azbell, 68, American journalist and writer, lung cancer.
- Bertrand Boissonnault, 88, Canadian Olympic fencer (1936).
- George Kirby, 72, American comedian, Parkinson's disease.
- Jean-Luc Lagarce, 38, French actor, theatre director and playwright, AIDS-related complications.
- Junior Robinson, 27, American football player (New England Patriots, Detroit Lions).
- Jakob Segal, 84, Russian-German professor of biology .
- Bertil von Wachenfeldt, 86, Swedish sprinter and Olympian (1928, 1936).
- Frederick Warner, 77, British diplomat.
