= Mary Ebun Kolawole =

Nigerian academic administrator

Dean for Postgraduate School Kwara State University
- In office 2017–2018
- Succeeded by: Professor Abdulaheem Hamzah

Personal details
- Born: Mary Ebun Kolawole; 10 March 1949 Lagos Island
- Died: 16 February 2021 (aged 71) Ilorin Kwara State
- Education: Ahmadu Bello University Zaria
- Profession: Academic; Educator; Administrator
- Awards: National Honors for Humanities University of Berkely

Mary Ebun Kolawole is a Nigerian professor of gender studies. She is the first female professor of Africa literature/culture, American literature and Gender studies who was endowed with the National Honour for the Humanities at the University of California, Berkeley in 1990. Her academic career started at Obafemi Awolowo University, Ile Ife, Nigeria.

== Early life & post-retirement life ==
Mary was born on March 10, 1949 to Mr. Amos Odeyiola and Mrs. Deborah Adewoye, in Lagos Island (Isale Eko). She attended primary school in Iludun Oro, Kwara State, and secondary school in St. Faith Girls School, Kaduna. She obtained her B.A. in English from the Ahmadu Bello University, Zaria. She met her husband, Deboye Kolawole, during her undergraduate degree in Zaria but they got married in Ile-Ife where he was working after his M.Sc. from Zaria, and went on to Birmingham, UK for his Ph.D., where they had their first child, Folake, in Birmingham, UK in 1973,.

Mary and her husband returned to Nigeria on completion of Deboye’s doctorate, and settled in Ilorin, where they both worked at the Kwara State College of Technology (Now renamed Kwara State Polytechnic). In 1980, the family moved back to Ile-Ife, and initially worked at OSCAS, then known as Oyo State College of Arts & Science, before Deboye rejoined the then University of Ife, which later became the Obafemi Awolowo University, OAU, where Mary obtained her M.A. before her appointment as a faculty member of the university. She had her second child, Temiloluwa, In 1985 after which she was awarded a Ph.D. at Obafemi Awolowo University. She rose to the rank of professor at the Obafemi Awolowo University.

At Ile-Ife, Mary was involved with the All Souls Chapel in OAU, the Full Gospel Business Men’s Fellowship (FGBMFI), as well as several house fellowships on campus. Ile-Ife is where she worked alongside her husband primarily until their joint retirement in 2009.

After retirement, Professor Mary Kolawole took up a contract appointment at Kwara State University, where she spent a for few more years, serving in the capacities of Head of Department of English and Literary Studies, and Dean of Postgraduate School, until her disengagement in 2017.

== Publications ==
Mary Kolawole taught courses in Literature and attended several conferences, both nationally and internationally. She authored several books, most notable of the books are:

- Womanism And African Consciousness; and
- Gender Perceptions And Development In Africa.

Her book, Womanism and African Consciousness (published in1977) and others, are on the read-lists of many American and European universities. This book is a comprehensive study of the African woman's cultural, societal, and political audibility. Through an in-depth historical critique of indigenous oral and written genres by and about women, the author challenges the accepted notion that African woman are "voiceless" members of society. Gender Perceptions and Development in Africa is another book of Mary Kolawole. In its 7th edition, it was published in 1998 e.

Kolawole's other works include the Context of African Women’s Struggle, which was published in 1997 as well as Zulu Sofola: Her Life & Her Works, published in 1999 in English.

== Academic achievements ==
Professor Mary Kolawole was consultant to many international agencies including the Ford Foundation, the United Nations University, Tokyo, and the International Institute for Higher Education, New York. She was the Nigerian National Coordinator of the Women Writing Africa Project of the Feminist Press, New York. She won the USIA/National Endowment for Humanities, University of California Berkeley in 1990. She was the Rockefeller Fellow in African Cultural and Gender Studies at Africana Studies and Research Center, Cornell University, Ithaca, New York between 1991and 1992. She was also a Commonwealth Fellow, at the University of Kent in Canterbury, between 1994 and 1995. She was also the Foundation Associate of the African Gender Institute, University of Cape Town in1997, and Research Fellow, Nordic African Institute, Uppsala, Sweden, in 1999. She was a participant at the International Scholars' Program on "The 2000 African Internet Connectivity Project," University of Michigan, East Lansing, Michigan, in May, 2000. was notably the recipient of a Rockefeller fellowship at the Cornell University in Ithaca, New York, as well as the Commonwealth fellowship at the University of Canterbury, Kent. She also received other similar fellowships all over the world.

== Death ==
Mary died on February 16, 2021, just a few weeks bedore her 72nd birthday, after a brief illness.
