= Maneer Mirza =

English cricketer

Personal information
- Full name: Maneer Mohammed Mirza
- Born: 1 April 1978 (age 48); Birmingham, England
- Batting: Right-handed
- Bowling: Right-arm fast-medium
- Role: Bowler

Domestic team information
- Years: Team
- 1997: Worcestershire

Career statistics
Competition	FC	LA
Matches	6	4
Runs scored	17	–
Batting average	5.66	–
100s/50s	–/–	–/–
Top score	10*	141
Balls bowled	916	–
Wickets	19	1
Bowling average	32.63	113.00
5 wickets in innings	0	0
10 wickets in match	0	0
Best bowling	4/51	1/31
Catches/stumpings	1/–	–/–
- Source: ESPNcricinfo, 9 April 2021

Maneer Mohammed Mirza (born 1 April 1978) is an English first-class cricketer: a right-arm fast-medium bowler and right-handed batsman who played for Worcestershire. He was born to Pakistani parents in Birmingham on 1 April 1978 and is the younger brother of another former Worcestershire player, Parvaz Mirza, who died aged 24 in 1995.

In the 1996 season, Mirza played five matches for Worcestershire's second XI, taking 15 wickets at an average of 35.26. The following season, Mirza made his first-class debut in Worcestershire's drawn game against Pakistan A at New Road in July 1997. He took 3–136 in his only innings, and two weeks later made his County Championship debut against Kent, taking three wickets in the match. Derek Hodgson of The Times described him as having "a fine delivery action in an impressively sharp spell" and "an interesting, possibly exciting proposition." Having reached the first team he remained there for the rest of the season, playing a total of six first-class games and taking 19 wickets at 32.63; he also appeared in four List A games, but took just one wicket in total.

In July 1998, after two games in the second XI championship, Mirza suffered a stress fracture of the back and was unable to play again that season. He returned for 1999 and 2000, but never managed to force his way back into the First XI, and eventually left Worcestershire in September 2000. He appeared once each for Surrey's and Leicestershire's second teams in 2002, but has never again played first-team county cricket.
