= Wedlock of the Gods =

Wedlock of the Gods is a postcolonial style play about breaking from the oppression of tradition in a male lead society. This three act play was written by Zulu Sofola, the first published, woman playwright from Nigeria.

== Major Characters (in order of appearance) ==
- Odibei- Adigwu's mother and Ogwoma's mother in law.
- Otubo- Odibei's friend
- Ogwoma- The widow of Adigwu and the lover of Uloko.
- Anwasia- Ogwoma's best friend
- Uloko- Ogwoma's lover
- Nneka- Ogwoma's mother
- Ogoli- Uloko's mother
- Ibekwe- Ogwoma's father

== Synopsis ==
=== Act One ===
Scene One:

The play begins in Ogwoma's house. Odibei enters and begins to examine the items and furniture in the room, searching for something. She wonders out loud about the death of her son when a neighbour, Otubo, enters looking for Ogwoma. Odibei continues searching for some kind of murder weapon or poison while the two converse about her son, Adigwu's, death. Otubo states wisely that people are born and people die and that is how life takes course but Odibei insists that her son's wife, Ogwoma had something to do with his death. She firmly believes that Ogwoma murdered him and has hidden the cause of his death in her house. Otubo insists that Ogwoma could not have killed her husband but Odibei won't hear it and is still searching the house, muttering to herself in somewhat of a crazed state. Odibei goes on to complain that Ogwama hasn't even been mourning her son properly during the three-month mourning period. Eventually Otubo is able to calm Odibei enough to lead her away from the Ogwoma's house to rest. Ogwoma and Anwasia enter carrying goods back from the market. Ogwoma is dressed suitably for mourning. As they enter it is clear that they were just having a very serious conversation. Anwasia goes on to reveal that the two friends were just talking about how Ogwoma is pregnant with another man's child even though she is still only on the second month of her three-month mourning period. Ogwoma doesn't want to talk about it but Anwasia pushes the subject saying that what she has done is unheard of in their culture and that she at least should have waited another month before letting another man in her bed. Anwasia also reminds her that it is custom for the widow to marry the brother of the deceased husband Ogwoma comes back by saying that Uloko is not just another man, she is the love of her life and because of that not she could not have waited. She goes on to say that she is not in mourning because her husband dying was no loss to her. She never felt anything for him and was forced to marry him through an arranged marriage for money. Anwasia reminds her that that is simply how it is in their culture and even goes on to say that Ogwoma should be grateful for the money the marriage brought her family because it saved her terribly ill brothers life. Anwasia warns Ogwoma about her mother in law, Odibei, when Uloko enters. The lovers embrace with passion and Anwasia announces that she is leaving. As she exits she insists that Ogwoma tell Uloko about the child. After a lot of pleading on Uloko's part Ogwoma finally tells him that his child is growing inside of her. Uloko is filled with joy. He lifts Ogwoma up and spins her around while he cheers with excitement. He claims that now that his child is inside of her there is no way she can be married to Adigwu's brother. Ogwoma stops the short celebration because she hears something outside. Worried that Odibei is sneaking around she tells Uloko that he must leave. Uloko doesn't understand the severity of the situation and stays put saying that they should just let Odibei catch them. Ogwoma insists that he go and says that he shouldn't underestimate Odibei's cruelty. Ogwoma admits that she plans to run away before her pregnant belly begins to show. Odibei enters and immediately advances on Ogwoma to slap her but Uloko gets in between them, defending his love. Odibei, in a rage, says that Uloko should be looking for marriageable women and not hanging around a woman in mourning's home. Ogwoma says that she always hated her son and that God has freed her to be with Uloko. Odibei goes to leave saying that no one messes with her. Uloko demands that she keep Ogwoma out of her evil plans but Odibei exits and simply says, “We will see.” Ogwoma breaks down into Uloko's arms in despair over Odibei catching them. Uloko promises that he will handle her and that no one can hurt them. Ogwoma continues to sob.

Scene Two:

The scene begins in Ogwoma's house. She is with her mother Nneka and the atmosphere is very serious. Nneka says that she heard that Odibei found Uloko in her daughter's home and says she is filled with shame. She calls her daughter a harlot for professing her love for another man other than her husband but Ogwoma again states that Adigwu is dead and therefore she is free. Nneka says that Adigwu has a brother but Ogwoma blurts out the news that she is pregnant to silence her. Nneka is horrified. She states that Ogwoma has defiled the worst taboo in the land and that Uloko will pay. Even knowing that her daughter is pregnant with Uloko's child Nneka continues to insist that Ogwoma is Adigwu's brothers's wife. Ogwoma cries that she will not let Nneka marry her to another man that she doesn't love. Nneka makes for the door swearing that she will get Uloko for what he has done. Ogwomas demands her not to touch him but exits saying, “He will know that Nneka still breathes.” Anwasia enters and tries to calm Ogwoma. She states rationally that it is normal in their culture for a widow to take the hand of the brother when the husband dies, especially if she had no children by her deceased husband. Ogwoma stands firm in her belief that she should be with whom she loves. Ogoli enters calling Ogwoma a dog and says that she has raised his son Uloko to be respectful and declares that she must had enticed him into bed with her. She yells at her to leave her son alone and then storms out of the house. Ogwoma begins to cry and Anwasia consoles her saying that God has a plan.

=== Act Two ===
Scene One:

Act Two opens during meeting of the men of the Onowu family and Okolie (the brother of Adigwu). The men chastise Ogwoma for refusing to marry Okolie and for taking another man into her bed during her period of mourning and therefore shaming her entire family. They call on Okolie to speak his wisdom but what he says shocks them. Okolie states that Ibekwe, Ogwoma's father, should have asked his brothers for money when his son was so sick. He said that marrying Ogwoma to someone who she hated just for money was out of line when he could have asked his family for help. This starts an argument between Ibekwe and Okolie where they bash and insult one another's families. Nothing is really settled during this meeting and Ibekwe apologizes for wasting his family's time. His brothers say that they hope Ibekwe isn't afraid to ask for more help from them.

Scene Two:

Udo, a member of the Onowu family, visits Uloko at his home and advises him to find another wife. Nneka enters in a storm of anger and promises that Uloko will never have her daughter as a wife. She says that what he has done is an abomination and has never been done before. She warns him to stay away from Ogwoma. She says that their bastard child will never see his face or taste his mother milk and at this Uloko demands that she stays away from his child and his Ogwoma. Nneka theatrens that Uloko's mother will warn in when all of a sudden Ogoli enters. She is shocked that Nneka would threaten her son's life because her daughter is the one who enticed him into bed with her. They go back and forth insulting each other's children until Nneka storms out. Udo follows her out the door and Uloko and his mother Ogoli are left. They argue about the shame that Uloko has brought on their family and then Ogoli leaves hurt and in distress. Anwasia enters looking for Ogwoma. She states that she can't find her anywhere and that she is worried. Uloko, worried as well, states that Odibei has done, Odibei has taken Ogwoma away. He grabs his cutlass (short sword type of weapon) and leaves with determination.

=== Act Three ===
Scene One:

Act Three begins with Odibei entering Ogwoma's house carrying herbal medicines and wearing a vicious expression. After doing some business with the medicine Uloko barges into the house asking where Ogwoma is. He theatrens Odibei with the cutlass but she continues to say that she doesn't know where Ogwoma is. Otubo enters and is shocked by what she sees. Uloko lowers his weapon and leaves after telling Otubo to find Ogwoma. Otubo pleads with Odibei to reveal where Ogwoma is but Odibei is silent. When Odibei is once again alone in Ogwoma's home she returns to conducting her dark magic. Nneka enters and is shocked and enraged by what she sees. She order Odibei to eave the house and Otubo returns to lead Odibei away from the house. Nneka set up her own medicinal objects and states that her daughter Ogwoma must not enter this house, evil things will happen if she does.

Scene Two:

Odibei's dark medical magic has put Ogwoma in a trance. Odibei order Ogwoma to drink from a jug she has poisoned in her house. Ogwoma, still in a trance, goes back to her house and does has she is told. She drinks from the poisoned water three times and then falls to the floor. Uloko comes running into the house and cries in despair as he sees his love on the floor. Ogwoma, still alive but barely, tells Uloko that she drank the poison water and then dies. Uloko is wild with pain. Anwasia, Nneka and Ibekwe enter and are distraught by what they see. Uloko dashes out of the house and then reenters with a bloody cutlass moments later saying he has killed Odibei. He then picks up the pot holding the poisoned water and drinks it. The others in the room, confused and distraught, try to stop him but he succeeds in drinking the poison. He dies next to his lover saying he will meet her in the afterlife.

== Themes ==
- Culture and Tradition - Ogwoma and Uloko defy their deep set culture and tradition by making love during Ogwoma's three-month mourning period. Chaos issues after this "evil act" of breaking tradition.
- Society Rules and Standards vs. Self Morales and Values
- The Woman's Role (in the family and in society)
- Arranged Marriage - A known driving force of arranged marriages during this time is poverty. Ogwoma's family married their daughter to the man with the most money instead of the man that she loved because they didn't have enough money for their ill son.

== Zulu Sofola (1938-1995) ==
Nwazuluoha Onuekwueke Sofola, more commonly known as Zulu Sofola, was a key artist in the development of modern theatre Nigeria. She was a very educated female during a time when most parents did not send their daughters to receive a higher education out of fear that it would hinder their daughters from finding a husband. Zulu's parents broke tradition and because of that a fiery, feminist, tradition breaking playwright was born. Not only was she a leader in the development of Nigerian theatre she was also a pioneer female playwright in the country and a very prominent feminist writer of the time. She was a very versatile playwright as well. She wrote for the stage, television and radio. Her plays reacted to issues that plagued her society. The plays tend to include characteristics such as ritual, myth, magic, tradition and legend, but her feminism is the characteristic that shines through most of her plays, especially in Wedlock of the Gods. She creates characters that fight her fight as an oppressed woman in a male dominated society. In Wedlock of the Gods not only is Ogwoma trying to break out of her culture and tradition to marry the one she loves, she is also trying to break out of the male dominated society to stay true to herself. Zulu makes it very clear that the rules set by this traditional society are set by the dominating men but largely affect the woman. Zulu showcases that women have no hand in their own destiny because it is set and established by the man. "Zulu Sofola’s writing style is simplistic and her knowledge of self and pride in her heritage is demonstrated in her plays, some of which portrayed Issele-Uku culture and names. In her plays, she shared her extraordinary knowledge of her country’s history and traditions and present circumstances, particularly as they related to women." Zulu helped shaped Nigerian theatre into what it is today and gave voices to those who needed raising and shed light on issues that needed to be seen.
