= Dee Cannon =

British actress and acting coach (1962–2020)

- Born: 6 June 1962; London, England, U.K.
- Died: 28 September 2020 (aged 58)
- Occupation: Acting coach

Dee Cannon (6 June 1962 – 28 September 2020) was a British actress and acting coach.

== Life and career ==
Cannon was born in London in June 1962 to David, a property developer, and Doreen Cannon, a highly respected acting coach. She trained as an actress at the Arts Education Drama School and later with Uta Hagen at the HB Studio in New York. In 1993 she was invited to teach and direct at the Royal Academy of Dramatic Art (RADA). She was the senior acting coach at RADA for 17 years and directed over 30 plays there. As an acting coach Dee Cannon based her work around Stanisklavski technique and drew inspiration from Uta Hagen, Stella Adler, and her own mother, Doreen Cannon.

Dee's work as a freelancer outside RADA included major theatre, film and television productions across the world. She conducted masterclasses and workshops in London, New York, Los Angeles, Manila, Tel Aviv, Jerusalem, Gothenburg, Berlin and Bulgaria. She was also an accomplished author, publishing three books including the bestselling 'In Depth Acting', and two modern monologues collections for actors.

During her time at RADA and as a freelancer Dee had a significant impact on the industry and was responsible for training many notable actors including: Cynthia Erivo, Tom Hiddleston, Gemma Arterton, Simon Callow, Phoebe Waller-Bridge, Jason Mamoa, Matthew Modine, Rita Ora, Tom Felton, Billie Piper and Jon Voight.

Dee died on 28 September 2020 from multiple myeloma, at the age of 58.
