= Gavin Smith (Australian footballer) =

Australian rules footballer (1948–1995)

Personal information
- Full name: Gavin John Smith
- Born: February 25, 1948; Yallourn
- Died: September 15, 1995 (aged 47); Warragul
- Original team: Yallourn
- Height: 190 cm (6 ft 3 in)
- Weight: 87 kg (192 lb)
- Position: Ruck

Playing career^{1}
Years	Club	Games (Goals)
1967	Fitzroy	1 (0)
- ^{1} Playing statistics correct to the end of 1967.

Gavin Smith (25 February 1948 – 15 September 1995) was an Australian rules footballer who played with Fitzroy in the Victorian Football League (VFL).
