= Parvaz Mirza =

English cricketer

Parvaz Mirza (Urdu: پرویز مرزا; 17 December 1970 – 24 September 1995) was an English first-class cricketer: a right-arm medium-pace bowler who also batted right-handed.

Born in Birmingham, Mirza played two games for Warwickshire's second team in 1990 before appearing for Worcestershire's second team later that summer. For the next few years he made sporadic appearances at Second XI level, for Worcestershire, Warwickshire and Hampshire. He also played for Herefordshire in the 1993 MCC Trophy. In the 1994 season, by now a full-fledged Worcestershire player, Mirza broke through to make his first-class debut in the game against Oxford University and took 4-29 in the first innings. He also played in two County Championship games that season, as well as three List A matches, all in the AXA Equity and Law League.

In 1995 Mirza was a fairly regular member of Worcestershire's one-day side, playing 15 times and taking 18 wickets in that form of the game at an average of 24.33; he was selected less often for in first-class matches, but still made six appearances. In the Championship match against Derbyshire in August he took his only five-wicket innings haul, returning figures of 5-110 in the first innings; he was also instrumental in saving the game for his county when he shared in an unlikely unbroken last-wicket partnership of 30 with Paul Thomas.

Mirza played his final match against Glamorgan on 17 September, though poor weather meant that he did not bat or bowl. Exactly one week later, he died suddenly at his Birmingham home in his mother's arms. Worcestershire secretary Mike Vockins said, "We are devastated. The news has come as a complete bombshell". It was later revealed that Mirza had been suffering from a cardiac condition that had not been picked up by a check-up he had undergone shortly before his death.

Parvaz's brother, Maneer Mirza, played ten games for Worcestershire in the 1997 season.

He grew up in the Small Heath area of Birmingham, where he became good friends with Wasim Khan who also went on to become a professional cricketer. In Khan's biography he tells tales of boyhood memories of Parvaz, such as crafting a cricket bat out of a piece of wooden fencing and sneaking into Edgbaston to see international cricket games.
