= Mort Browne =

Australian rules footballer, born 1908

Personal information
- Full name: Morton Richard Browne
- Born: 19 April 1908; Carlton, Victoria
- Died: 3 September 1995 (aged 87)
- Original team: Essendon Seconds

Playing career^{1}
Years	Club	Games (Goals)
1932	Footscray	1 (0)
- ^{1} Playing statistics correct to the end of 1932.

Morton Richard Browne (19 April 1908 – 3 September 1995) was an Australian rules footballer who played with Footscray in the Victorian Football League (VFL).
