= Don Gibson (Australian footballer) =

Australian rules footballer, born 1908

Personal information
- Full name: Donald Andrew Gibson
- Born: 24 August 1908; Carlton, Victoria
- Died: 2 September 1995 (aged 87); Byaduk, Victoria

Playing career^{1}
Years	Club	Games (Goals)
1929	North Melbourne	3 (0)
- ^{1} Playing statistics correct to the end of 1929.

Donald Gibson (24 August 1908 – 2 September 1995) was an Australian rules footballer who played with North Melbourne in the Victorian Football League (VFL).

== Career ==
He played in three games during the 1929 season for the North Melbourne Football Club, scoring no goals.
