= Tony Paulekas =

American football player (1912–1995)

Profile
- Position: Center

Personal information
- Born: August 9, 1912; Cherry Valley, Pennsylvania, U.S.
- Died: September 18, 1995 (aged 83); Farrell, Pennsylvania, U.S.
- Listed height: 5 ft 10 in (1.78 m)
- Listed weight: 210 lb (95 kg)

Career information
- College: Washington & Jefferson

Career history
- Green Bay Packers (1936)

Awards and highlights
- NFL champion (1936)
- Stats at Pro Football Reference

Anthony J. Paulekas Jr. (August 9, 1912 – September 18, 1995) was an American football center in the National Football League (NFL) for the Green Bay Packers. He played college football at the Washington & Jefferson College.

In 1974, he was inducted into the Mercer County Hall of Fame.
