= Joe Azbell =

American journalist (1927–1995)

- Born: Joe Allen Azbell; August 25, 1927; Vernon, Texas, U.S.
- Died: September 30, 1995 (aged 68); Montgomery, Alabama, U.S.
- Occupation: Journalist

Joe Azbell (August 25, 1927 – September 30, 1995) was an American journalist and writer. He served as the city editor of the Montgomery Advertiser.

== Life ==
Azbell was born in 1927 in Texas near the Oklahoma border. When Azbell was 7, his father died and his mother struggled to support her large family alone. At the age of 13, he ran away from home. He hitchhiked his way across the United States and Mexico, earning a living by picking cotton, washing dishes and selling and printing newspapers. He then joined the United States Army Air Corps, where he scored well on the Army General Classification Test. He was the top of his class at the Air Force's administration school and was sent to Maxwell Air Force Base in Montgomery. He was the founder and editor of the Air University Dispatch, the official newspaper for the base. After his military service ended in 1946, Azbell moved to Selma where he founded his own newspaper. While in Selma, he also began writing speeches for pro-integration Governor Jim Folsom. He later moved to Montgomery, where he became the city editor for the Montgomery Advertiser. In his spare time, Azbell provided transport to hospitals for black children stricken with polio, as most members of the black community did not own a car.

In 1954, Azbell received an honorary doctorate from Selma University, a historically black college.

External videos
- "Interview with Joseph Azbell" conducted in 1985 for the Eyes on the Prize documentary in which he discusses the Montgomery bus boycott, E. D. Nixon, and Martin Luther King Jr.

In 1956, local community leader E. D. Nixon gave Azbell a pamphlet by the Montgomery Improvement Association calling for a bus boycott. He published it on the front page of the Montgomery Advertiser, alerting local residents to begin the Montgomery bus boycott. Journalist Ted Poston later called Azbell the father of the bus boycott as Poston believed that many in the African-American community were unaware of the planned boycott prior to publication. Azbell interviewed many civil rights figures of the day such as Martin Luther King Jr., Ralph Abernathy, A. Philip Randolph and Rufus Lewis. He was the first reporter on the scene after King's home was bombed on January 30, 1956, and the first on the scene when E.D. Nixon's house was bombed two days later. Azbell later testified in King's favor when he was on trial in State of Alabama V. M. L. King, Jr. for inciting the boycott.

Azbell also was a speechwriter for George Wallace. He developed Wallace's presidential campaign slogan "Send them a message".

Azbell became "obsessed with the belief that the (Communist) Party had created a vast conspiracy operating through America's black community" that would lead to a race war. By the mid-1960s, Azbell's admiration of Martin Luther King Jr. had turned to the conviction that King was a danger to American society. In an analysis he shared with Wallace in "an ongoing dialogue," Azbell came to believe that King had manipulated public opinion by portraying their movement as one of unsophisticated Alabama police officers versus prayerful and forgiving blacks. He saw civil disturbances in Northern cities as unmasking the reality that, he wrote, "the remainder of the nation tasted the fear" of racial disorder.

In 1986, at a 30th anniversary commemoration of the Montgomery bus boycott, Azbell "was credited with providing much needed publicity for the boycott."

Azbell died in Montgomery, Alabama on September 30, 1995.
