= Reg Twite =

Australian rules footballer, born 1911

Personal information
- Full name: Reg Twite
- Born: 29 April 1911
- Died: 21 September 1995 (aged 84)
- Original team: Bena

Playing career^{1}
Years	Club	Games (Goals)
1933	Essendon	2 (0)
- ^{1} Playing statistics correct to the end of 1933.

Reg Twite (29 April 1911 – 21 September 1995) was an Australian rules footballer who played with Essendon in the Victorian Football League (VFL).
