= Doreen Cannon =

- Born: October 21, 1930; New York City, United States
- Died: September 18, 1995 (aged 64); London, United Kingdom
- Occupation: Actress

Doreen Cannon (October 21, 1930 – September 18, 1995) was an American actress. She trained in acting for many years, and performed in various plays in New York City, where she was born and raised. She was a prolific teacher of acting, working as Head of Acting at various drama schools. Cannon was a follower of the Stanislavski technique of method acting.

Doreen Cannon died on 18 September 1995. Her daughter, Dee Cannon, followed in her footsteps as an acting coach, and follows her mother's acting method.

== Career ==
Cannon trained as an actress at the HB Studio in Manhattan for over 10 years with Uta Hagen and Herbert Berghof. Cannon's contemporaries included Peter Falk, Geraldine Page, Sandy Dennis, Maureen Stapleton, Anne Meara and Jerry Stiller. She appeared in many off-Broadway plays, and appeared in Summer Stock alongside stars such as Dorothy Lamour, Robert Alda, Alan Alda and Basil Rathbone. She married an English property developer named David Cannon in NYC, and moved to London in 1959. She was subsequently invited by George Devine to teach master workshops at The Royal Court Theatre.

Cannon was one of the first actors to bring the Stanislavski technique of method acting from the U.S. to the U.K. In 1963, she was invited to be Head of Acting at Drama Centre London. This was the first "Method" school to open in the United Kingdom. She taught and directed there for 20 years and was responsible for training such actors as: Pierce Brosnan, Colin Firth, Geraldine James, Frances de la Tour, Penelope Wilton, Garry Cooper and Simon Callow, who wrote about his training with Doreen in his book "Being an actor". She formed her own theatre company in the 1970s, Theatre 84, which was one of the first fringe companies in London. In 1978 she was asked to head acting lessons at Adam Darius Mime School in London.

Cannon also ran her own acting workshops and gave acting classes. Notable students included Jennie Buckman, Ann Pennington, Emma Relph, Angelique Rockas, and Annabel Brooks.

In 1983, Cannon was invited to become Head of Acting at The Royal Academy of Dramatic Art (RADA). Hiring Cannon was a major shift in the training at RADA - after 80 years, this was the first time they decided to embrace the Stanislavski technique of Method. At the Royal Academy of Dramatic Art she trained such actors as Michael Sheen, Adrian Lester, Indira Varma, Matthew Macfadyen and Ioan Gruffudd. As well as being known for her teaching technique at the various drama schools she had worked for, Cannon was invited to be a guest teacher and director in Sweden at Göteborg Teaterhögskolan i Göteborg and Teaterhögskolan Malmö, which she did for more than two decades. Cannon's views on acting were published in a book, Masters of the Stage. She also conducted various master classes and was a guest teacher at the HB Studio in New York City.
