= Tom Chisari =

American football player and coach (1922–1995)

Biographical details
- Born: November 17, 1922; Washington, D.C., U.S.
- Died: September 5, 1995 (aged 72)

Playing career
- 1942–1945: Maryland
- Position(s): Back

Coaching career (HC unless noted)
- 1948: Catholic

Head coaching record
- Overall: 1–7

Thomas Guy Chisari (November 17, 1922 – September 5, 1995) was an American football coach. In 1948, he served as the head coach for the Catholic Cardinals football team at the Catholic University of America. He attended the University of Maryland, where he played football as a back. In 1941, while attending St. John's College High School in Washington, D.C., Chisari was named a Washington Post All-Met back.

== Head coaching record ==
Year	Team	Overall	Conference	Standing	Bowl/playoffs
Catholic University Cardinals (Mason–Dixon Conference) (1948)
1948	Catholic University	1–7	0–5	T–7th	
Catholic University:		1–7	0–5		
Total:		1–7			
