= Ted Wood (footballer) =

Australian rules footballer, born 1916

Personal information
- Full name: Ted Wood
- Born: 5 April 1916
- Died: 12 September 1995 (aged 79)
- Original team: Preston

Playing career^{1}
Years	Club	Games (Goals)
1942	Melbourne	2 (0)
- ^{1} Playing statistics correct to the end of 1942.

Ted Wood (5 April 1916 – 12 September 1995) was an Australian rules footballer who played with Melbourne in the Victorian Football League (VFL).
