= Richard Guy Condon =

American anthropologist (1952–1995)

- Born: January 16, 1952; Plainfield, New Jersey, U.S.
- Died: September 7, 1995 (aged 43); Chukotka, Russia
- Education: University of Pittsburgh
- Known for: Research amongst the Inuit of Holman
- Scientific career
- Fields: Anthropology
- Workplaces: University of Arkansas

Richard Guy "Rick" Condon (January 16, 1952 – September 7, 1995) was an American anthropologist who specialized in the study of Inuit. He was curator of the Peary-MacMillan Arctic Museum and editor of the international journal, Arctic Anthropology.

== Early years ==
Condon was born in Plainfield, New Jersey, United States. In 1974, he received a bachelor's degree in anthropology from Rutgers University, and in 1981, he received a Ph.D. from the University of Pittsburgh. His dissertation was entitled, Inuit behavior and seasonal change: a study of behavioral ecology in the central Canadian Arctic.

== Career ==
His anthropological research included the people of Holman (Ulukhaktok, Victoria Island, Canada), northern Alaska, and Baffin Island.

Condon became associate editor for Arctic Anthropology in 1989, and worked to translate and publish Russian works in the journal.

He was an associate professor at the University of Arkansas from 1992 until his death.

== Personal life ==
Condon married the anthropologist Pamela Rose Stern in 1984. They collaborated on several research projects. Condon and Stern had two daughters, Kimberly and Morgan.

He disappeared September 7, 1995, in Chukotka, Russia, and it is presumed he drowned while traveling by boat between Sireniki and Provideniya.

== Partial works ==
- (1982), Inuit natality rhythms in the central Canadian arctic
- (1983), Inuit behavior and seasonal change in the Canadian Arctic
- (1987), Inuit youth : growth and change in the Canadian Arctic
- (1996), The northern Copper Inuit : a history
