= Bob O'Shaughnessy =

American basketball player

Personal information
- Born: February 2, 1921 San Jose, California, U.S.
- Died: September 5, 1995 (aged 74) Lihue, Hawaii, U.S.
- Listed height: 6 ft 0 in (1.83 m)
- Listed weight: 175 lb (79 kg)

Career information
- High school: C. K. McClatchy (Sacramento, California)
- College: Nevada (1942–1943, 1945–1947)
- Position: Guard

Career history
- 1947–1948: Syracuse Nationals
- 1948: Utica Olympics

Robert Arthur O'Shaughnessy (February 2, 1921 – September 5, 1995) was an American professional basketball player. He played for the Syracuse Nationals in the National Basketball League during the 1947–48 season and averaged 4.0 points per game.

O'Shaughnessy's collegiate career at the University of Nevada, Reno, was interrupted by serving for the United States Army Air Forces in World War II. He flew over 50 missions against the Imperial Japanese Army, primarily in the Philippines. Back at Nevada, he competed for the track, basketball, and baseball teams.
