= Zulu Sofola =

Nigerian playwright and dramatist (1935–1995)

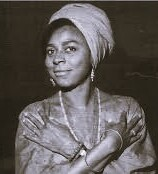
- Born: Nwazuluwa Onuekwuke Sofola; June 22, 1935; Bendel State, British Nigeria
- Died: September 5, 1995 (aged 60)
- Education: Virginia Union University; The Catholic University of America; University of Ibadan
- Occupations: Playwright, dramatist, academic
- Known for: First published female Nigerian playwright; first female Professor of Theatre Arts in Africa
- Notable work: Wedlock of the Gods (1972), The Sweet Trap (1977)

Nwazuluwa Onuekwuke "Zulu" Sofola (22 June 1935 – 5 September 1995) was the first published female Nigerian playwright and dramatist. Sofola was also a university teacher and became the first female Professor of Theater Arts in Africa.

== Biography ==
Nwazuluwa Onuekwuke Sofola was born in the former Bendel State to Nwaugbade Okwumabua and Chief Ogana Okwumabua who were Igbo from Issele-Uku, Aniocha North Local Government Area, presently Delta State in the south-southern region of Nigeria. She attended Federal Government Primary School in Asaba and the Baptist Girls High School in Agbor all in Delta State. Due to her outstanding performance in school, she was awarded a scholarship to complete her high school education in Nashville, Tennessee. Spending her adolescence and early womanhood in the US, she studied at Southern Baptist Seminary, earned a BA in English at Virginia Union University in Richmond, Virginia in 1959. She obtained her MA in Drama (Play writing and Production) from The Catholic University of America in Washington DC in the year 1965. She returned to Nigeria in 1966, and became a lecturer in the Department of Theatre Arts at the University of Ibadan, Oyo State, where she obtained a PhD in Theatre Arts (Tragic Theory) in 1977.

== Career ==
Her plays "range from historical tragedy to domestic comedy and use both traditional and modern African setting". She uses "elements of magic, myth and ritual to examine conflicts between traditionalism and modernism in which male supremacy persists." She was considered one of the most distinguished women in Nigerian literature. She remains a source of inspiration to young African writers. Sofola's most frequently performed plays are Wedlock of the Gods (1972) and The Sweet Trap (1977). She died in 1995 at the age of 60.

== Achievements ==
- Scholarly awards and distinctions both nationally and internationally.
- Recipient of a Fulbright Scholarship.
- Represented Nigeria at the first International Women Playwrights Conference.

== Selected works ==
- The Deer Hunter and The Hunter's Pearl (1969), London: Evans Brothers.
- The Disturbed Peace of Christmas (1971), Ibadan: Daystar Press.
- Wedlock of the Gods (1972), Ibadan: Evans.
- The Operators, Ibadan: Ibadan University, 1973.
- King Emene: Tragedy of a Rebellion (1974), Heinemann Educational Books. ISBN 0-435-92860-0
- The Wizard of Law (1975), Evans Bros. ISBN 0-237-49951-7
- The Sweet Trap (1977); Ibadan: Oxford University Press. ISBN 0-19-575386-0
- Old Wines Are Tasty (1981), Ibadan: Oxford University Press. ISBN 978-154-499-6
- Memories in the Moonlight (1986), Ibadan: Evans Brothers.
- Queen Omu-ako of Oligbo, Buffalo: Paul Robeson Theatre, 1989.
- Eclipso and the Fantasia, Illorin, Nigeria: 1990.
- The Showers, Illorin, Nigeria: 1991.
- Song of a Maiden: A Play, Illorin, Nigeria: Heinemann, 1992.
- Lost Dreams and Other Plays, Ibadan: Heinemann, 1992.
