= Albert Goodwin (historian) =

English historian (1906-1995)

- Born: 2 August 1906; Sheffield, England
- Died: 22 September 1995 (aged 89)

Academic background
- Education: King Edward VII School
- Alma mater: Jesus College, Oxford; University of Paris

Academic work
- Discipline: History
- Sub-discipline: History of France; French Revolution; Political history
- Institutions: The Queen's College, Oxford; University of Liverpool; Jesus College, Oxford; University of Manchester

Albert Goodwin (2 August 1906 – 22 September 1995) was a Fellow of Jesus College, Oxford (where he had previously been a student) and later Professor of Modern History in the University of Manchester. In his book of the same name, he presented his liberal interpretation of the French Revolution as 'a merciless conflict between aristocracy and democracy' caused by the refusal of Louis XVI to accept the role of a constitutional monarch.

== Life and career ==
Goodwin was born in Sheffield and educated at King Edward VII School, winning a scholarship to Jesus College, Oxford in 1924. After completing his studies he became a Laming Travelling Fellow of Queen's College, Oxford which enabled him to pursue graduate studies at the Sorbonne in Paris in 1928–1929. His first teaching post was as Assistant Lecturer in European History at Liverpool University from 1929 until 1931. He left that position to join the staff of Jesus College, Oxford where he held a variety of posts from 1931 to 1939, including Junior Dean, Librarian, and Dean of Degrees.

During World War II, Goodwin served as an officer in the Royal Air Force. He returned to academic life at Jesus College, Oxford after the war, serving as Senior Tutor in 1947-1948 and then Vice- Principal from 1949 to 1955. In 1953 he succeeded Lewis Namier as Professor of Modern History at Manchester University; a post he retained until 1969. In 1969 and 1970 he was a visiting fellow at All Souls College, Oxford.

== Books ==
- The Federalist Movement in Caen during the French Revolution. 1960 (paperback)
- The French Revolution. 1953; 2nd ed 1966
- The European nobility in the eighteenth century; studies of the nobilities of the major European states in the pre-Reform era. 1954; 2nd ed 1967
- Counter-revolution in Brittany : The royalist conspiracy of the Marquis de la Rouerie, 1791-3. 1957
- (with J.S. Bromley) Select list of works on Europe and Europe overseas, 1715–1815. Edited for the Oxford Eighteenth Century Group. 1974
- The Friends of liberty : The English democratic movement in the age of the French Revolution. 1979
