= James Morris Colquhoun Colvin =

British army major

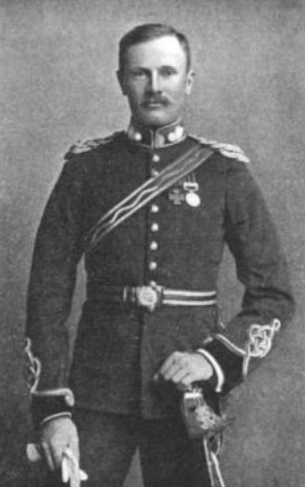
- Born: 26 August 1870; Bijnor, United Provinces, India
- Died: 7 December 1945 (aged 75); Stanway, Essex, England
- Relatives: Sir Noel Beresford-Peirse (son-in-law)
- Military career
- Allegiance: United Kingdom
- Branch: British Army
- Rank: Colonel
- Units: Royal Engineers
- Conflicts: Chitral Expedition; Mohmand Campaign; Malakand Frontier War; Second Boer War; World War I
- Awards: Victoria Cross

Colonel James Morris Colquhoun Colvin VC (26 August 1870 – 7 December 1945) was an English recipient of the Victoria Cross, the highest and most prestigious award for gallantry in the face of the enemy that can be awarded to a member of a British or Commonwealth force.

== Early life ==
Colvin was born in Bijnor, United Provinces, British India to James Colquhoun Colvin of the Manor House, Sutton Veny, Wiltshire, and Camilla Fanny Marie Morris, who was the eldest daughter of the Rev. Edward Morris. Colvin's father serviced with the Bengal Civil Service. He was awarded the India Mutiny medal for defending the House of Arrah. The Colvin family had been involved for a long time in various capacities in the British East Indies, serving as soldiers and administrators. Colvin's extended family members included Sir John Russell Colvin, Lieutenant-Governor of the North-West Provinces during the Indian Mutiny, and his sons Sir Auckland, K.C.S.I. and Sir Elliot Graham, K.C.S.I. Their most notable cousin was the English writer and curator Sir Sidney Colvin, known for his friendship with the young Robert Louis Stevenson.

== Military service ==
He was educated at Charterhouse and the Royal Military Academy, Woolwich. There, for distinguished proficiency, he was awarded the Pollock Gold Medal and Memoir as a Cadet Senior Under Officer. He was also awarded the Regulation Sword for exemplary conduct. A travelling clock, aneroid barometer, thermometer and compass were awarded to him for maths and mechanics. H.R.H. the Duke of Cambridge presented the awards after inspecting cadets at RMA Woolwich, on 26 July 1889.

On 27 July 1889, Colvin joined the Royal Engineers as a second lieutenant. Three years later, he was promoted to lieutenant on 27 July 1892. He served in the Chitral Relief Force in 1895 with the 4th Company, Bengal Sappers and Miners. He served on the North West Frontier of India with the Malakand Field Force in 1897–1898, and took part in operations in Bajaur, and in the Mohmand country and in Buner. He was mentioned in dispatches.

=== Mohmand Campaign ===
Colvin was 27 years old, and a lieutenant in the British Army Corps of Royal Engineers during the Mohmand campaign of 1897–98 in India when his actions resulted in him subsequently being awarded the Victoria Cross.
Colvin was in the Mohmand Valley, North West British India, with Lieutenant Thomas Colclough Watson on the night of 16/17 September 1897. Watson collected a party of volunteers and led them into the village of Bilot. They attempted to dislodge the enemy who were inflicting losses on the British. Although Watson had been incapacitated by his wounds, undeterred, Lieutenant Colvin made two additional attempts to clear enemy fighters from the village. "He was conspicuous during the whole night for his devotion to his men, in the most exposed positions and under very heavy fire."

The award of the Victoria Cross was published in the London Gazette on 20 May 1898. The citation read;

Lieutenant James Morris Colquhoun Colvin, Lieut., Royal Engineers. On the same occasion, after Lieutenant Watson had been incapacitated by his wounds from further effort, Lieutenant Colvin continued the fight and persisted in two more attempts to clear the enemy out of the dark and still burning village. He was conspicuous during the whole night for his devotion to his men in the most exposed positions under a heavy fire from the enemy.

Queen Victoria invested Colvin with the Victoria Cross on 19th July 1898 at Windsor Castle.

Two others who served with Colvin were also awarded a Victoria Cross—Lieutenant Thomas Colclough Watson and Corporal James Smith, The Buffs ( East Kent Regiment). (Note: The London Gazette citation for Watson reads:"This Officer, on the 16th September 1897, at the village of Bilot, in the Mamund Valley, collected a few men of the Buffs ( East Kent Regiment) and of No. 4 Company, Bengal Sappers and Miners, and led them into the dark and burning village to dislodge some of the enemy who were inflicting loss on our troops. After being wounded and driven back, he made a second attempt to clear the village, and only desisted after a second repulse and being again hit and severely wounded.") (Note: The citation for Smith reads:"On the night of the 16th-17th September 1897, Corporal Smith, with a party of the Buffs, responded to Lieutenant Watson's call for volunteers, and followed that Officer into the burning village of Bilot, driving off the enemy with the bayonet. Afterwards, although wounded, he continued firing steadily and coolly, and also helped to carry the wounded to the place prepared for them. When Lieutenant Watson left, in order to fetch assistance for the wounded, Corporal Smith held the position till that Officer's return, exposing his life freely in watching the enemy and directing the fire of his men.")

Colvin served with the Malakand Field Force, 1897–98, where he took part in operations in Bajaur, the Mohmand Country and in Bruner (mentioned-in-Despatches L.G. 11 January 1898).

=== Second Boer War ===
Colvin was promoted to captain on 1 April 1900, and served in South Africa in 1901–02 during the Second Boer War as Special Service Officer. In May 1901 he was appointed an Aide-de-camp to Lieutenant-General Sir Bindon Blood, who was stationed in eastern Transvaal. He remained in South Africa until the war ended in May 1902, and left for Calcutta on the SS Umlazi two months later. For his service in the war, he was again mentioned in despatches (L.G. 22 August 1902), received the brevet promotion to major and awarded the Queen's Medal with three clasps on 22 August 1902, and his name was noted as qualified for Staff employment.

=== Later service ===
- Appointed Staff Captain, Army Headquarters, Simla, India on 11 April 1903 to 15 March 1906
- Passed Staff College, Camberley, in 1909
- General Staff Officer 2nd Grade, Quetta Division on 7 May 1911 to 2 November 1915
- Promoted Lieutenant-Colonel on 18 January 1917
- Mentioned-in-Despatches (the Despatch, dated 20 August 1918, of Sir C.C. Munro) vide p. 13907 of London Gazette No. 31031, dated 26 November 1918.
- Appointed Commandant, 3rd Sappers and Miners, Kirkey, India

=== Orders and medals ===
- Victoria Cross
- India General Service Medal 1895–1902 with clasps 'Relief of Chitral 1895', 'Punjab Frontier 1897–98'
- Queen's South Africa Medal(1899–1902) with clasps 'Transvaal', 'South Africa 1901', and 'South Africa 1902'
- British War Medal (1914–20)
- King George VI Coronation Medal (1937)

== Family ==
Colvin married Katharine Way, youngest daughter of Colonel George Augustus Way, CB on 23 January 1904 in Simla, India. They had three children:

- Katharine Camilla Colvin, who married Noel Beresford-Peirse
- James Bazett Colvin
- John Alexander Colvin, born 9 July 1913

== Death details ==
James Colvin died at Stanway, near Colchester on 7 December 1945, aged 75. He was cremated at Ipswich Crematorium on 11 December, and his ashes scattered in the Old Garden of Rest.
