= Thomas Colclough Watson =

Recipient of the Victoria Cross

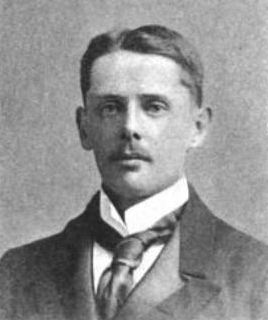
- Born: 11 April 1867; Velsen, Netherlands
- Died: 15 June 1917 (aged 50); London, England
- Military career
- Allegiance: United Kingdom
- Branch: British Army
- Service years: 1888–1917
- Rank: Lieutenant colonel
- Units: Corps of Royal Engineers
- Conflicts: First Mohmand Campaign; World War I: Mesopotamian campaign
- Awards: Victoria Cross

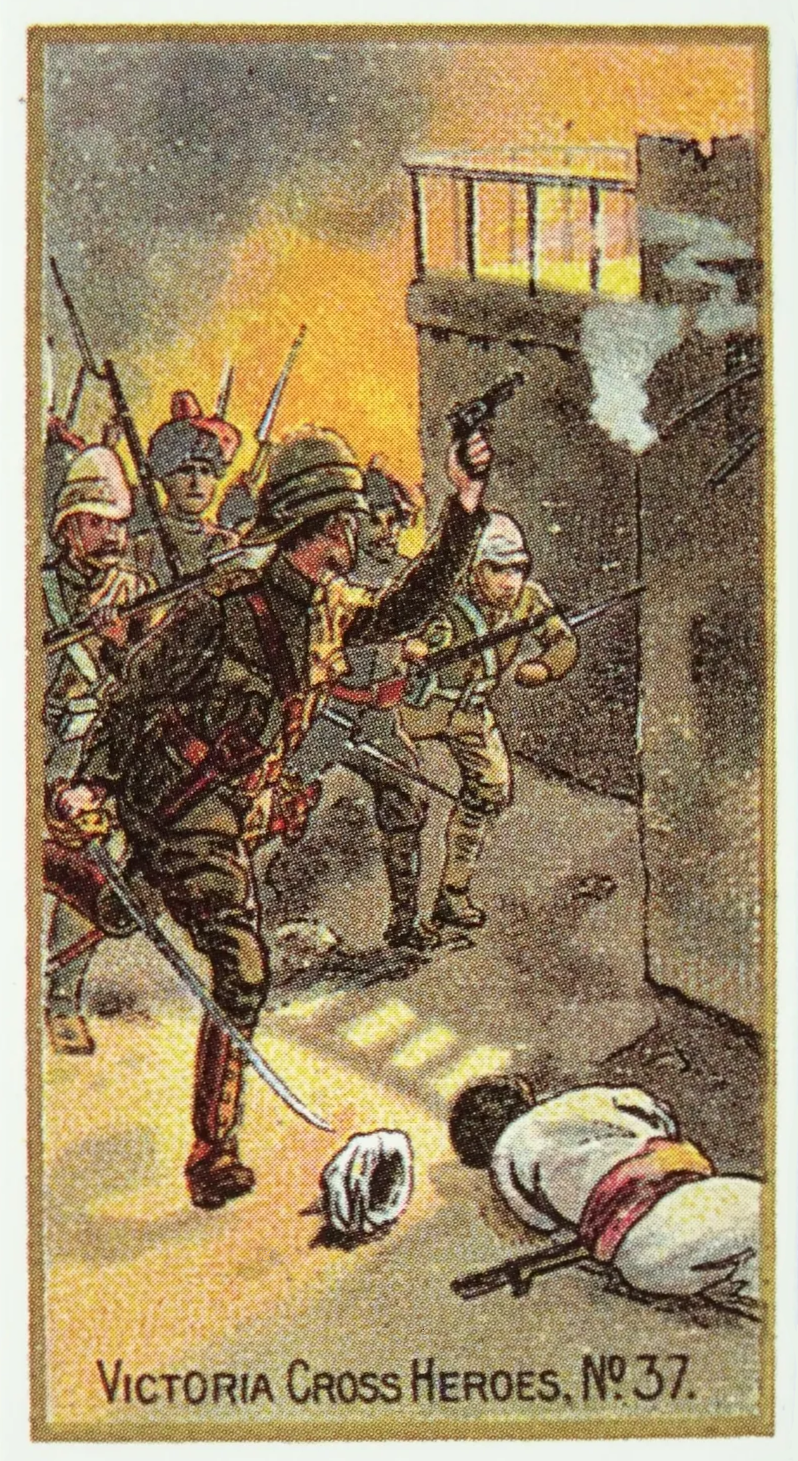
Watson's VC action

Lieutenant Colonel Thomas Colclough Watson VC (11 April 1867 – 15 June 1917) was a recipient of the Victoria Cross, the highest and most prestigious award for gallantry in the face of the enemy that can be awarded to British and Commonwealth forces.

Watson was educated at the King Edward VI Grammar School in Louth, Lincolnshire, before attending the Royal Military Academy, Woolwich. He was commissioned into the Royal Engineers in February 1888 and promoted to lieutenant in 1891.

== VC action ==
Watson was a 30 years old lieutenant in the Royal Engineers, British Army, attached to the Bengal Engineers, British Indian Army during the First Mohmand Campaign in North-West India, when the following deed took place for which he was awarded the VC:

On 16 September 1897, at the village of Bilot, in the Mamund Valley, he collected a few men of the Buffs (East Kent Regiment) and of No. 4 Company, Bengal Sappers and Miners, and led them into the dark and burning village to dislodge some of the enemy who were inflicting loss on our troops. After being wounded and driven back, he made a second attempt to clear the village, and only desisted after a second repulse and being again hit and severely wounded.

For their parts in the action, Lieutenant James Morris Colquhoun Colvin and Corporal James Smith also received the VC.

An account mentioning Watson is given in Winston Churchill's The Story of the Malakand Field Force.

== Later career ==
Gaining promotion to captain in 1899 and major in 1906, Watson spent a number of years in the Military Works Service in India.

Promoted to Lieutenant Colonel in January 1915, he became a Divisional Engineer Commander in April that year. He died in London on 15 June 1917, aged 50, of illness contracted while serving in Mesopotamia during World War I, and was cremated at Golders Green Crematorium. His wife Edith was awarded the Royal Red Cross.

His medals sold at auction in December 2014 for £312,000. They was purchased by Lord Ashcroft, a collector of Victoria Crosses, and are displayed at the Imperial War Museum.
