= William Hope Meiklejohn =

British Indian Army general

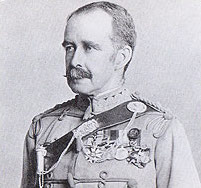
- William Meiklejohn
- Military career
- Allegiance: United Kingdom
- Branch: British Indian Army
- Rank: Brigadier-General
- Commands: Malakand Field Force
- Conflicts: Siege of Malakand 26 July – 2 August 1897
- Awards: Knight Commander of the Order of the Bath; Companion of the Order of St Michael and St George

Brigadier-General Sir William Hope Meiklejohn, KCB, CMG (/ˈmiːkəlˌdʒɒn/; 1845 – 1909) was a British military commander of the British Indian Army, who was in charge of the British garrison during the siege of Malakand in 1897.

== Military career ==
Meiklejohn was commissioned a second lieutenant on 4 December 1861, promoted to lieutenant on 11 December 1862, captain on 24 May 1871, and major on 1 July 1881. He advanced to senior rank as lieutenant-colonel on 4 December 1887, and was promoted to colonel on 29 August 1893.

As colonel, he was in charge of the British garrison during the siege of Malakand in northern India from 26 July to 2 August 1897 and later led a relief force to the besieged fort of Chakdara along with Sir Bindon Blood, fighting against 50,000–100,000 Pashtun tribesmen and suffering only 206 casualties. Meiklejohn was later credited for his skills in providing such a victory in dispatches sent to the military government in British India.

He was appointed in command of a district in the Bengal Army on 8 December 1898, and posted to Rohilkhand, where he stayed in command until February 1900, when he returned home for a prolonged leave for medical reasons. He was promoted to major-general on 19 March 1900. In April 1901 he was posted to Lucknow, and officiated in command there until late 1902 when the actual commanding officer Sir Alfred Gaselee arrived. Meiklejohn had been appointed in command of the district at Derajat in August 1901, but it appears he did not take up this position as he officiated in Lucknow.

== Family ==
Meiklejohn married, in 1893, Maud Louisa Hamilton Beamish, daughter of Rear-Admiral Henry Hamilton Beamish.
