= Mari, Pakistan =

Historic ruin in Punjab, Pakistan

Mari is a historic ruin in Mianwali District, Punjab, Pakistan. According to the district Gazetteer of Mianwali of 1915 the remains of Mari (and the nearby ruin of Kafir Kot) "are indication of the existence of a Hindu civilization of considerable importance and antiquity". The ruins of Mari are located in Mianwali Tehsil at 32° 57' 32″ N, 71° 35' 7″ E.

According to the 1915 District Gazetteer:

there is a picturesque Hindu ruin, crowning the gypsum hill, locally called Maniot (from Manikot, meaning fort of jewels), on which the Kalabagh diamonds are found. The ruins themselves must once have been extensive. It appears that the very top of the hill was built over with a large palace or fort. The massive walls belonging to one of the rooms, which still stands out of the debris in an almost tottering condition, and the ornamental carving thereon, testify to the magnitude of the building and the skill employed in its construction. Lower down the eastern slope, there are two small temple shaped buildings of the same style and material, similar to those found at the two Kafirkots. These buildings were either temples or out-offices serving as sentinel's posts. The local account of these ruins is that the structures were erected by the Pandavas while they were in exile. If there is any truth in this, they should date from the Mahabharat time. There is no evidence, however, justifying the assignment of so old an origin to them. Some fakir is known to have taken up his abode on this hill at a more recent date. At his death, he was cremated there, and his remains deposited in one of the temple-shaped buildings, and probably the remains of one of his disciples were interred in the other. These temples are now revered by the Hindus as the samadh of that fakir, who is known as Naga Arjan or Naga Uddhar. While there are no traces of massive fortifications like those at Kafir Kot Til Raja, some surviving people have reported seeing remnants of arrangements for lifting water out of the river. People occasionally find old coins among the ruins. The discovered silver coins, roughly the size of a four-anna piece, bear the impression of a horse on one side and a bullock on the other.
