= Battle of Chakdara =

Large battle between British/Indian and Pashtun tribesmen in 1897

- Part of Siege of Malakand
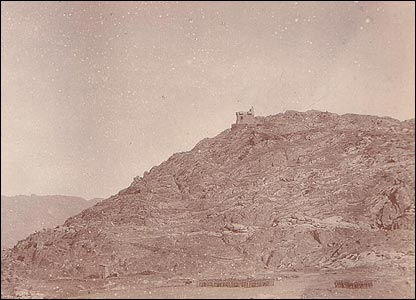
- The Signal tower overlooking Chakdara fort in 1897
Date	26 July – 2 August 1897 (1 week)
Location	Chakdara, British India
Result	British Victory

Belligerents
(United Kingdom) British Empire: United Kingdom; British Raj	Pashtun tribes: Yusufzai; Mohmand; Utmankhel; Swati; Bunerwal

Commanders and leaders
(United Kingdom) Lt. Haldane Rattray (WIA) (United Kingdom) Lt. Wheatley (United Kingdom) Cpt. Wright (United Kingdom) Cpt. Baker	Faqīr Saidullah

Units involved
45th Bengal Lancers; 45th Rattray's Sikhs; Pashtun Levies	Tribesmen

Strength
240 men: one 9-pounder field gun; two Maxim guns	1,500 (on 26 July); 12,000–14,000 (by 31 July)

Casualties and losses
(United Kingdom) 1 wounded (British Raj) 6 killed, 11 wounded	2,000 Killed

The Battle of Chakdara was a battle and siege of a British military fort by rebel Pashtun tribesmen during the Siege of Malakand in colonial British India's North West Frontier Province in 1897. Due to the defensive nature of the battle, the event draws parallels with the Battle of Rorke's Drift during the Anglo-Zulu War.

== Background ==
Following the end of the Chitral Expedition in 1895, the British built a suspension bridge over the River Swat near the village of Chakdara. The British also constructed a fort on the site of an old Mughal fort and also a signal tower overlooking the fortress and bridge.

Similar to one of the causes of the Waziristan unrest in 1894, British work on the Durand line, signifing the newly organised border between Afghanistan and the British Raj; and thus the division of Pashtun lands, appeared to the Pashtun tribes in the area as a precursor to an official British annexation of tribal lands into the Raj. It is also thought that the recent Ottoman victory over Greece inspired Islamic tribes to fight against the British, who were seen as foreign Kafir. Some more fanatical tribes even declared Jihad to 'sweep away the British' as a form of holy war.

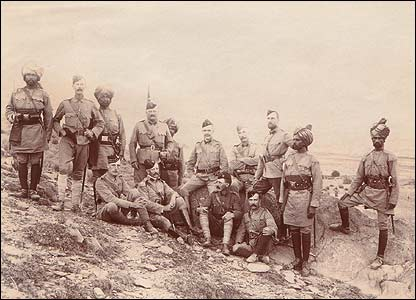
A mixture of British troops and Sikh sepoys that fought in Malakand.

Towards 1897, news of unrest in the nearby Pashtun villages had reached the British garrisons in Malakand. Major Deane, the British political agent, noted the growing unrest within the Pashtun sepoys stationed with the British. On 26 July, a sepoy who was out sketching had also been robbed by tribesmen in the area and had reported that a tribal force was encroaching down the valley towards the fort.

Accounts of the siege of Malakand and Chakdara were published by Winston Churchill in his first non-fiction book, The Story of the Malakand Field Force.

== The battle ==
Despite British authorities knowing of the Pashtun unrest, nothing substantial was done in preparation. Especially at the temporary camps near the Malakand Pass, making them appear as easy targets for an attack.

Chukdara fort lied several miles to the north-east of Malakand and was lightly manned. A total of around 240 mostly Indian soldiers were stationed in the fortress and nearby signal tower.

=== 26 July ===
On the evening of 26 July, Haldane Rattray, the First-Lieutenant in command of the garrison at Chakdara, had travelled to the nearby settlement of Khar, to play a game of Polo with other British officers from Malakand. By the end of the game, two sowars had arrived in Khar with a message from Second-Lieutenant Wheatley, who was still at Chakdara, informing Rattray that a large force of armed tribesmen were making their way to the fortress. Upon hearing this news, Rattray headed back to Chakdara on horse-back, passing some tribesmen on the way.

Once Rattray had arrived at the fort, a message was telegraphed to British forces in Malakand that they were about to come under attack. The fort's telegraph lines were sabotaged shortly after this message was sent, effectively cutting off the fort from other British forces in the area and leaving them wide-open for an attack.

A soldier of the state of Dir, that were allied with the British, had promised to inform the fort of any impending attacks by lighting a bonfire as a warning. At about 10:30pm on 26 July, a bonfire had been lit, in response the garrison was called to stand-to in preparation. Shortly thereafter, the fort came under heavy fire from tribal forces hidden in the dark, beginning the battle. The fort was now to be under constant fire for the next week.

Shortly after tribal forces opened fire on the fort, their initial attack began, with a wave of tribesmen attempting to take the fort. This attack and several others throughout the night were defeated with the use of volley fire from the fort's loopholes.

=== 27 July ===
By now, British forces in Malakand had also begun to come under attack from tribal forces, despite this, Captain Wright of the 11th Bengal Lancers and Captain Baker of the 2nd Bombay Grenadiers were assigned to travel to and reinforce Chakdara fort, with a force of around 40 sepoys. Wright and Baker begun their trip that morning and fought through several skirmishes on the way north, realising the true strength of the enemy on the way. Wright and Baker eventually arrived at the fort later that morning, under cover from one of the fort's Maxim guns. Captain Baker immediately set his task improve the fort's existing defences.

At about 11:30am, another wave of tribesmen attempted to breach the perimeter of the fort's defences, however this was attack was also repulsed by the defenders, with several of the tribesmen being gunned down at the base of the fort's wall. After this attack was repelled, at around midday, a group of six men were sent to reinforce the signal tower, along with food and water.

By this time, the tribesmen had begun to construct stone Sangars in the vicinity of the signal tower, keeping the tower under constant fire. This prevented British forces from using the tower's roof as a defensive platform and also prevented communication with forces in Malakand by the use of a heliograph.

At around 11pm, the tribesmen had mustered up for another attack. Lt. Wheatley had noted the tribesmen's points of concentration and prepared the garrison accordingly. When the attack began, one of the Maxim guns opened fire on the advancing tribesmen, killing at least 70. Despite this, at 1am, tribesmen with scaling ladders still attempted to breach the walls, but were also gunned down by rifle fire.

=== 28 July ===
The entire day of 28 July consisted of continuous firefights between the attackers and defenders. At 5:30pm, another attack was launched by the tribesmen, who formed a large semi-circle around the fort, carrying several large banners representing their tribal affiliations. During the attack, several tribesmen charged straight up to the base of the walls, some getting entangled and gunned down in barbed wire on the way. This attack continued on into the early hours of the next day, to no avail for the attackers.

=== 29 July ===
With the fort still under continuous fire, the tribesmen assembled in Chakdara village itself. At 3pm, they attacked the fort again, attempting to destroy the defensive barbed wire by throwing blocks of grass and dirt on them. This attack was also defeated.

On the same day, a significant group of tribesmen began to launch offensive operations on the signal tower, causing a small fire which caused no significant damage to the structure. About 50 tribesmen were killed in the failed attack on the signal tower, prompting the attackers to retreat by 5pm.

=== 30 July ===
Although firefights did not cease on 30 July, the confidence of the attacking tribesmen was wavering, so much so they only launched one small attack on the fort at 7pm that afternoon, allowing the defenders some rest. Some sepoys were reportedly falling asleep at their loopholes, after having been continuously fighting for the previous 96 hours.

=== 31 July ===
Throughout the day. However, tribal reinforcements from Bajaur and the Malizai clan had arrived at Chakdara. Furthermore, large numbers of tribal reinforcements began to arrive at Chakdara from Malakand, whilst being pursued by the British relief column that was also on its way to Chakdara. These reinforcements raised the number of tribesmen on 26 July from 1,500 to 12,000-14,000 by 1 August, overwhelmingly outnumbering the exhausted defenders. On the evening of 31 July, attacks on the ford had resumed.

=== 1 August ===
Bolstered by reinforcements, a significantly larger and more organised attack was now being conducted on Chakdara fortress, using superior numbers, the terrain and entrenchments against the seriously fatigued defenders. During this attack, the tribesmen had captured the civilian hospital next to the fort and were using it as a staging ground to launch up-close attacks. The signal tower was also now fully cut off from the fort, starving the men there of critical supplies. These tribal reinforcements were also heavily armed, some using Martini–Henry and Snider–Enfields.

A Sepoy by the name of Prem Singh, with the use of a loophole, managed to send a message by heliograph to the main British force in Malakand. As stated in Lt. Rattray's official report: "Matters now looked so serious that we decided to send an urgent appeal for help, but owing to the difficulty and danger of signalling we could not send a long message, and made it as short as possible, merely sending the two words, 'Help us.'"

=== 2 August ===
By now, the British relief column was well within sight of Chakdara and would soon be on site to relive the fortress. In a last ditch attempt to win over the fort, the tribesmen launched one large final attack on the fort. Attacking from all sides and causing some casualties amongst the ranks of the defenders, killing several. Despite the enormity of the attack, large numbers of tribesmen were shot and killed by the garrison.

By late morning, cavalry of the Guides and the 11th Bengal Lancers were seen to be crossing the Amandara Ridge on the far side of the Swat River, cutting down many tribesmen on the way and forcing the remaining others to retreat. The relief force had finally arrived.

Seeing allied reinforcements approaching the fort, Lt. Rattray ordered the doors of the fort be flung open and launched a final bayonet charge into the remaining tribesmen occupying the civilian hospital. At least 30 tribesmen were killed in Rattray's charge. Rattray was wounded in the neck by the last tribesman he bayonetted.

Shortly after, the relief cavalry arrived at the entrance of the fort, finally lifting the week-long siege and forcing the remaining tribesmen to retreat from the area.

== Aftermath ==
During the week-long siege, 6 British Indian Army soldiers were killed and 11 others were wounded, including Lieutenant Rattray. Over 2,000 tribesmen were also killed in the week-long siege.

A British punitive campaign was launched in the region afterwards. Medals were awarded to the defenders of the fort and members of the Malakand relief force.

== See also ==
- Battle of Rorke's Drift
- Military history of the North-West Frontier
- Military history of Pakistan
- Military history of India
- History of the British Raj
