= James Smith (VC) =

English recipient of the Victoria Cross

- Smith circa 1898
- Born: 1871; Maidstone, Kent
- Died: 18 March 1946 (aged 74–75); Dartford, Kent
- Burial place: Watling Street Cemetery, Dartford
- Military career
- Allegiance: United Kingdom
- Branch: British Army
- Rank: Colour-Sergeant
- Units: The Buffs (East Kent Regiment)
- Conflicts: First Mohmand Campaign; Chitral Expedition
- Awards: Victoria Cross

James Smith VC (1871 – 18 March 1946) was an English recipient of the Victoria Cross, the highest and most prestigious award for gallantry in the face of the enemy that can be awarded to British and Commonwealth forces.

Smith was about 26 years old, and a corporal in The Buffs (East Kent Regiment), British Army during the First Mohmand Campaign, British India when the following deed took place for which he was awarded the VC.

On the night of 16/17 September 1897, in the Mamund Valley, North-West India, Corporal Smith, with other men, responded to a call for volunteers and followed two officers of the Royal Engineers (James Morris Colquhoun Colvin and Thomas Colclough Watson) into the burning village of Bilot, driving off the enemy with the bayonet. Afterwards, although wounded, Corporal Smith continued, firing steadily and coolly, and also helped to carry the wounded to the place prepared for them. When Lieutenant Watson left, in order to fetch assistance for the wounded, Corporal Smith held the position till that Officer's return, exposing his life freely in watching the enemy and directing the fire of his men.

For their parts in the action, Lieutenants Watson and Colvin also received the VC.

Smith later achieved the rank of colour-sergeant. He is buried in Watling Street Cemetery in Dartford, Kent.

His Victoria Cross was on display at The Buffs Regimental Museum, Canterbury, England. With the rest of that museum's collection, it has now been transferred to the National Army Museum in Chelsea, London.

== Bibliography ==
- Ingleton, Roy (2011). Kent VCs. Pen and Sword Books. ISBN 978-1848844094.
