= Bengal Engineer Group =

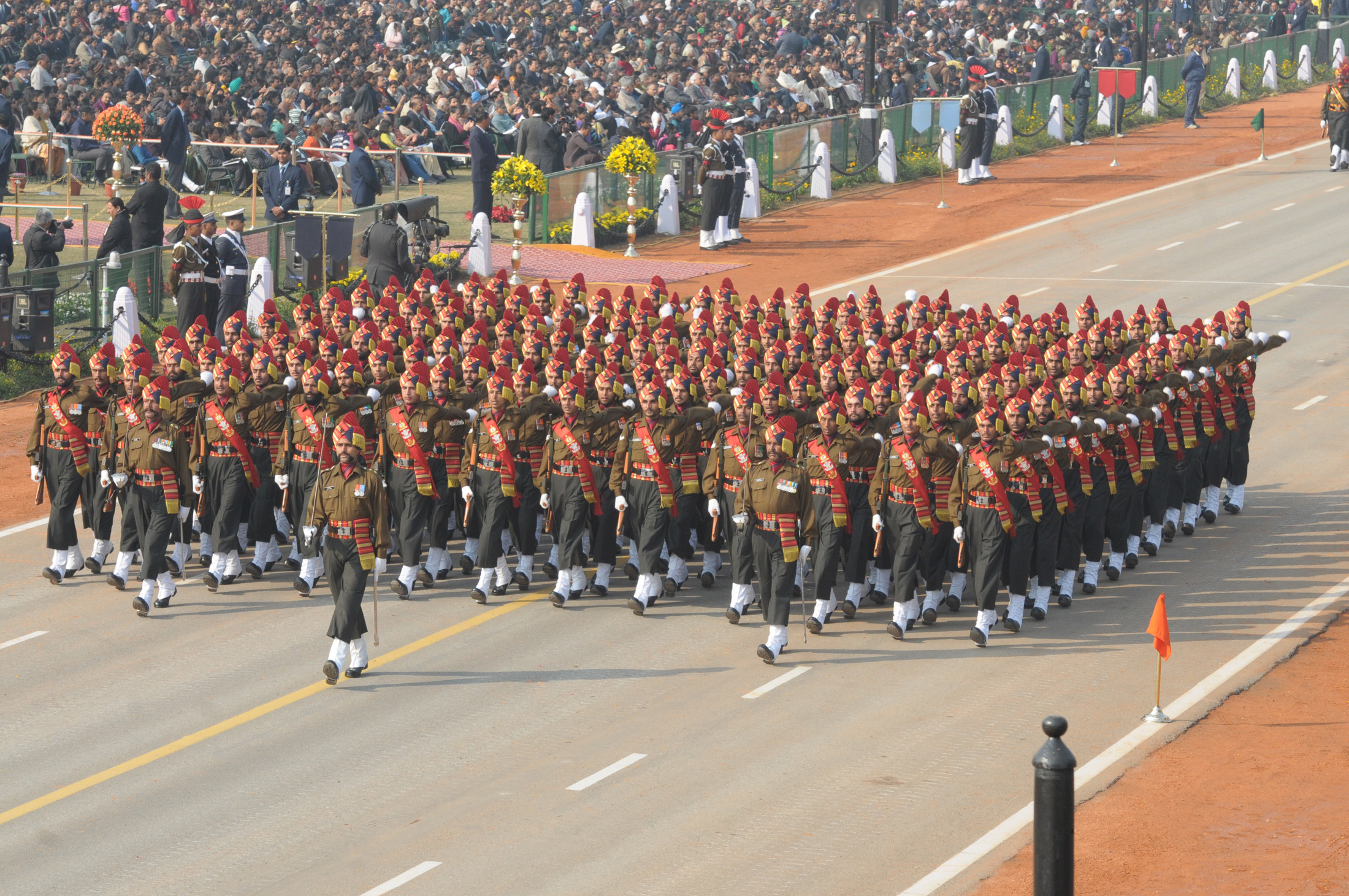
- Bengal Engineers on the Rajpath, New Delhi during the 72nd Republic Day Parade, 26 January 2021
- Active: 1803–present
- Country: India
- Allegiance: Republic of India (historically: Bengal Army; Indian Army)
- Branch: Corps of Engineers
- Role: Military engineering
- Regimental Centre: Roorkee, Uttarakhand
- Nicknames: Bengal Engineers, Bengal Sappers
- Motto: "Sarvatra"
- Colors: On January 12, 1989, the president's colour was presented to the Bengal Engineer Group by the President R Venkataraman, at Roorkee
- Anniversaries: 7 November
- Decorations: 11 Victoria Cross; 117 Indian Order of Merit; 01 Padma Bhushan; 02 Padma Shri; 04 Kirti Chakra; 03 Vir Chakra; 24 Shaurya Chakra; 04 Yudh Seva Medal; 190 Sena Medals; 11 Arjuna Awards; 01 Dhyan Chand Award
- Battle honours: 80; 11 Theatre honours

Commanders
- Colonel Comdt of Bengal Sappers: Lt Gen Raghu Srinivasan, VSM
- Colonel of the Regiment: Lt Gen Arvind Walia, AVSM; Engineer - in - Chief
- Notable commanders: Lt Gen J. S. Dhillon

The Bengal Engineer Group (BEG; informally the Bengal Sappers or Bengal Engineers) is a military engineering regiment in the Corps of Engineers of the Indian Army. The unit was originally part of the Bengal Army of the East India Company's Bengal Presidency, and subsequently part of the British Indian Army during the British Raj. The Bengal Sappers are stationed at Roorkee Cantonment in Roorkee, Uttarakhand.

The Bengal Sappers are one of the few remaining regiments of the erstwhile Bengal Presidency Army and survived the Rebellion of 1857 due to their "sterling work" in the recapture by the East India Company of Delhi and other operations in 1857–58. The troops of the Bengal Sappers have been a familiar sight for over 200 years in the battlefields of British India with their never-say-die attitude of Chak De and brandishing their favourite tool the hamber.

Over the years, the Bengal Sappers have won 80 battle and 11 theatre honours, 11 Victoria Cross, 117 Indian Order of Merit, 24 Shaurya Chakra, 190 Sena Medals and 11 Arjuna Awards, the highest number of won by any single organization in the country. Lt Gen Joginder Singh Dhillon was commissioned into Bengal Engineer Group in 1936 and commanded the First Republic Day Parade in New Delhi, becoming the first army officer to be awarded the Padma Bhushan in November 1965. Among the three Sapper units of the Indian Army, the Bengal Sappers was the first engineer group to receive the 'President Colours' in recognition of its service to the nation, on 12 January 1989, by Ramaswamy Venkataraman, the eight President of India, who presented the Regimental Colours to Bengal Engineer Group at Roorkee.

Besides service on the battlefield, the Bengal Engineers also rendered valuable peacetime contributions. The military engineer Lt. James Agg designed St John's Church, Calcutta. It was based on James Gibbs's St Martin-in-the-Fields in London and was consecrated in 1787. St John's was the Anglican cathedral of the city – capital of the Bengal Presidency – until St Paul's Cathedral, begun 1839, was completed in 1847. St Paul's was also designed by a Bengal Engineer, William Nairn Forbes, who was also architect of the "Old Silver Mint" building at the India Government Mint, Kolkata, basing its portico on the Parthenon on the Acropolis of Athens.

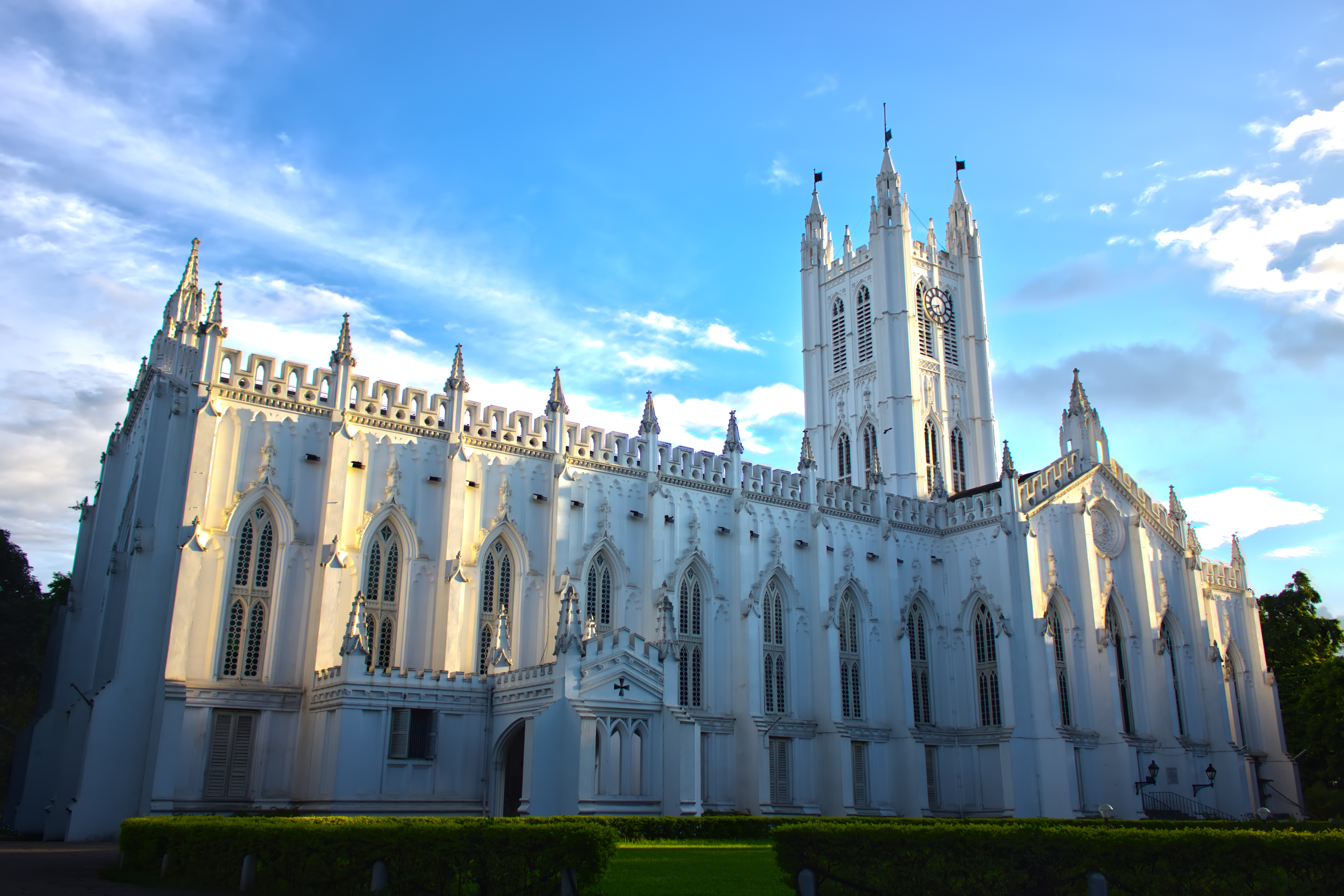
St Paul's Cathedral, Kolkata, designed by William Nairn Forbes, Bengal Engineers. Built 1839–47.

== History ==
The Indian Army Corps of Engineers is one of the oldest arms of the Indian Army, dating back to 1780, when the two regular pioneer companies of the Madras Sappers were raised, as a part of the East India Company's army. Prior to its formation, by 1740s officers and engineers from the Kingdom of Great Britain served in the Bengal Engineers, Bombay Engineers and Madras Engineers, formed with the respective Presidency armies, while British soldiers served in each of the Presidencies' engineering companies, namely the Madras Sappers and Miners, Bombay Sappers and Miners, and the Bengal Sappers and Miners.

The Bengal Sappers and Miners was originally the Corps of Bengal Pioneers, which was raised from two pioneer companies in 1803, part of Bengal Army of the Presidency of Bengal; one raised by Capt T. Wood at Kanpur as Bengal Pioneers in November 1803, also known as "Roorkee Safar Maina". In 1819, at the conclusion of Third Maratha War, a part of Bengal Pioneers merged with the Company of Miners (raised in 1808) to become the Bengal Sappers and Miners, and raised at Allahabad, with Captain Thomas Anburey as the Commandant. The remaining part of the Corps of Bengal Pioneers was absorbed in 1833. In 1843 'Broadfoot's Sappers', which had been raised in 1840, merged into the Bengal Sappers and Miners.

In 1847 the Bengal Sappers and Miners was renamed Bengal Sappers and Pioneers, and in 1851 it became the Corps of Bengal Sappers and Miners. On 7 November 1853, the regiment moved to Roorkee, where it has maintained its regimental centre ever since. Lord Kitchener of Khartoum's 1903 Kitchener Reforms saw it re-designated as the 1st Sappers and Miners, which was again altered in 1906 to the 1st Prince of Wales's Own Sappers and Miners.

On the accession of George V to the throne in 1910 it was renamed 1st King George's Own Sappers and Miners, with the '1st' being dropped in 1923, to make it King George V's Own Bengal Sappers and Miners. In 1937 it was renamed King George V's Bengal Sappers and Miners, and in 1941 they became the 'King George V's Bengal Sappers and Miners Group of the Indian Engineers'. In 1946 it became the 'King George V's Group' of the Royal Indian Engineers. On Indian independence and partition in 1947, about half of the serving personnel were allocated to the Pakistan Royal Engineers. Corps of Engineers, after which they became the Bengal Engineer Group and Centre.The first Indian to be awarded the Indian Order of Merit gallantry award, Sub Devee Singh was a Bengal Sapper.The first World War saw the Bengal Sappers in action in Aden, Egypt, Palestine, Mesopotamia, Persia and France. The second World War saw them excel in North Africa, Italy, Malaya and Burma. For their courage and acts of valour, soldiers personnel of the Group were awarded a total of 39 Military Cross, 7 Indian Order of Merit, 22 Indian Distinguished Service Medal, and 42 Military Medal and the units of the Group won a host of battle honours. In 1950 the Bengal Centre Corps of Engineers participated in Jammu and Kashmir operations of 1948, Goa operations of 1961, Chinese war of 1962 and the Indo-Pak War of 1965 saw the Bengal Sappers Regiment at their very best with improvisation and innovation and these proved invaluable in the achievement of ultimate victory. Units of the Bengal Sappers rose magnificently to the demands made of them during the 1971 operations leading to the liberation of Bangladesh and the dismemberment of Pakistan. In many literatures, the operations in Bangladesh are best described as an "Engineers War", since ultimate victory depended to a large extent on the timely and skillfully executed passages of our forces across the innumerable obstacles in the riverine terrain of what was East Pakistan. The group units has also participated in major operations like "Operation Pawan, Operation Meghdoot, Operation Rakshak, Operation Parakram and Operation Snow Leopard.

The creation of India and Pakistan in 1947 was one of the most trying periods in the history of the Group. When existing assets of the Army were ordered to be shared on a two third-one third basis between India and Pakistan, the assets of Bengal Engineer Group were allotted to the Royal Pakistan Engineers. The greater part of the British Officers and units of the group, regimental funds and equipment thus went to Pakistan. The responsibility of the group fell to Col JS Dhillon, the first Indian Commandant who during the 1965 operations against Pakistan distinguished himself and moulded the Corps back into a supremely fit Sapper Group. When Pandit Jawaharlal Nehru visited Roorkee in November 1949, he was so impressed by the achievements of the Bengal Sappers Centre that he chose Brig JS Dhillon to lead the first Republic Day parade in 1950.

Currently, Sappers are required in the Indian Army operations to assist the infantryman by using technical skills and resources to overcome an enemy entrenched behind seemingly impregnable and impassable obstacles or fortifications. They assist and maintain the tactical mobility of forces during war by quickly making bridges, roads, airfields and railways, often in the face of the enemy. They impede the enemy's mobility by laying minefields, demolishing bridges, cratering roads and blowing up logistic installations. There are many other related tasks that the Sappers perform including providing shelter and facilities for the soldiers and equipment till the farthest places, water and sanitation to ensure the well-being of the Army. Naturally, the Sappers with these qualities also render help to the civilians in case of any natural disaster including floods, earthquakes, and ensuring basic necessities to the civilians. The soldiers of the Bengal Sappers have been a common figure on the fields of British India for over 200 years with their motto, Sarvatra.

== Battle honours ==
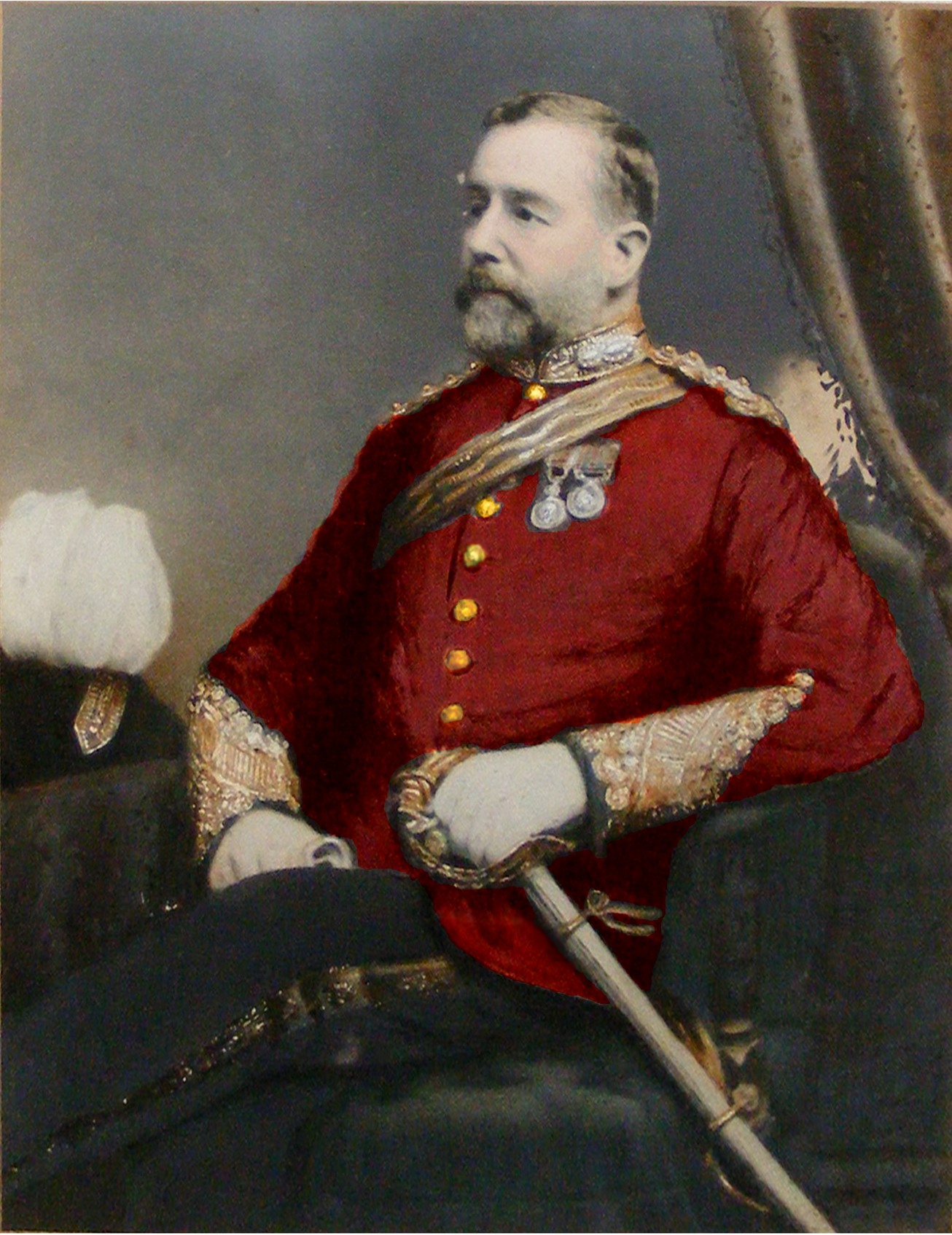
Colonel Thomas Tupper Carter-Campbell of Possil (Lord Lieutenant and Justice of the Peace, Argyllshire) Esquire Corps of Royal Bengal Engineers.

=== Colonial India ===
- Bhurtpore (1825)

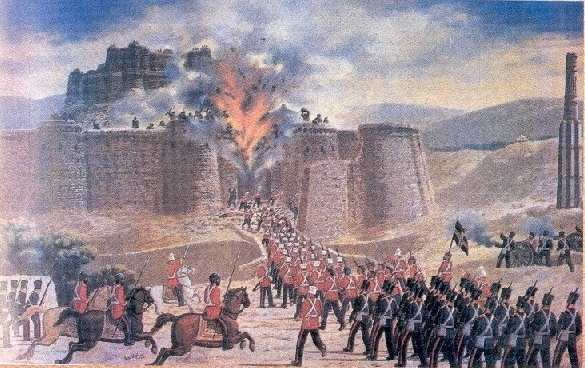
Bengal Sappers and Miners laying explosive charges and the subsequent storming of Ghazni. 23 July 1839, Battle of Ghazni, First Afghan War.

First Anglo-Afghan War (1839–1842)

- Battle of Ghazni, Kabul 1842

First Anglo-Sikh War

- Ferozeshah, Sobraon, Multan, Gujrat

Second Anglo-Sikh War

- Punjab

Indian Rebellion of 1857

- Delhi 1857, Lucknow

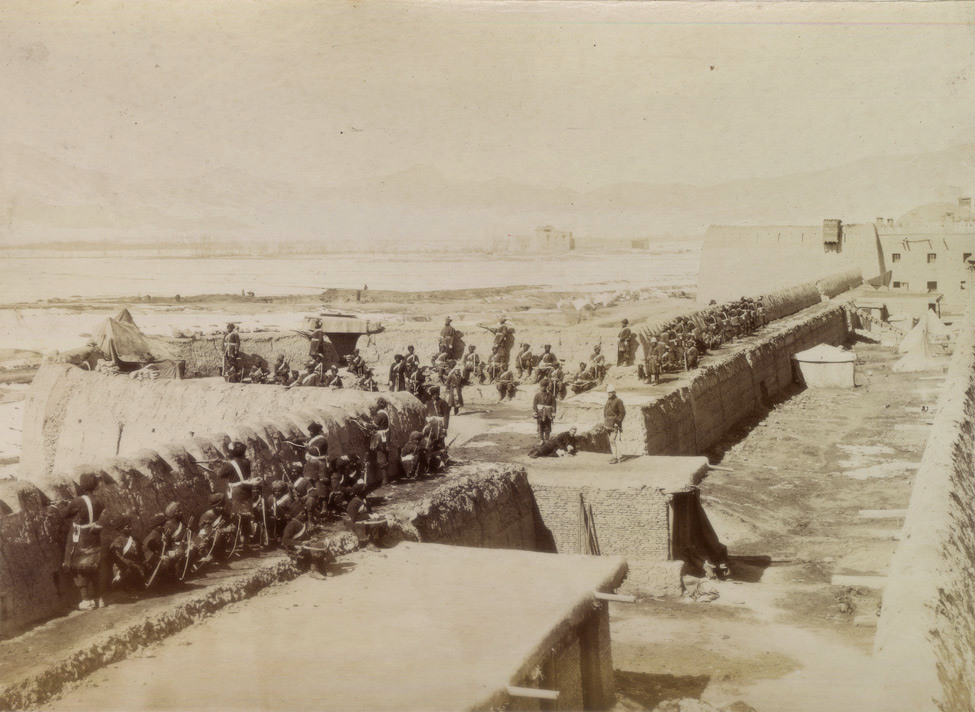
Bengal Sappers and Miners Bastion, at Sherpur cantonment, Kabul, Second Afghan War, c. 1879.

Second Anglo-Afghan War

- Afghanistan 1878–80
  - Ali Masjid, Charasiah, Kabul 1879, Ahmad Khel

Third Anglo-Burmese War (1885–1887)

- Burma 1885–87

Hunza–Nagar Campaign (1891)

- Hunza (princely state)
- Nagar (princely state)

Chitral Expedition (1895)

- Chitral

Tirah (1897–1898)

- Tirah

Boxer Rebellion

- China 1900

World War I

- France and Flanders 1914–15:
  - La Bassée 1914, Festubert 1914, Givenchy 1914, Neuve Chapelle, Festubert 1915, Aubers, Loos
- Mesopotamia 1915–18:
  - Defence of Kut al Amara 1915, Ctesiphon 1915, Tigris 1916, Baghdad, Khan Baghdadi, Sharqat, Kut al Amara 1917
- Aden
- Palestine 1918:
  - Megiddo, Sharon
  - Damascus
- Persia 1918
- North West Frontier India 1915 & 1916–17, Baluchistan 1918

Third Anglo-Afghan War

- Afghanistan 1919

World War II

- Malaya 1941–42
  - Kampar
- North Africa 1940–43
- Italy 1943–45
  - Cassino II
- Burma 1942–45
  - Yenangyaung 1942, Ngakedaung Pass, Jail Hill, Meiktila.

=== Republic of India ===
First Indo-Pakistani War

- Jammu and Kashmir 1947–48

Indo-Pakistani War of 1965

- Jammu and Kashmir 1965
- Punjab 1965
- Rajasthan 1965

Third Indo-Pakistani War

- East Pakistan 1971
- Jammu and Kashmir 1971
- Sindh 1971

== Victoria Cross recipients ==
| Name | Event | Date of action | Place of action |
|---|---|---|---|
| Duncan Home | Indian revolt | 14 September 1857 | Delhi, India |
| James Innes | Indian revolt | 28 February 1858 | Sultanpore, India |
| Philip Salkeld | Indian revolt | 14 September 1857 | Delhi, India |
| John Smith | Indian revolt | 14 September 1857 | Delhi, India |
| Edward Thackeray | Indian revolt | 16 September 1857 | Delhi, India |
| William Trevor | Anglo-Bhutanese War | 30 April 1865 | Dewangiri, Deothang, Bhutan |
| James Dundas | Anglo-Bhutanese War | 30 April 1865 | Dewangiri, Deothang, Bhutan |
| Edward Leach | Second Afghan War | 17 March 1879 | Khyber Pass, Afghanistan |
| Fenton Aylmer | Hunza-Naga Campaign | 2 December 1891 | Nilt Fort, British India |
| James Colvin | First Mohmand Campaign | 16 September 1897 | Bilot, British India |
| Thomas Watson | First Mohmand Campaign | 16 September 1897 | Bilot, British India |

== See also ==
- Madras Engineer Group
- Bombay Engineer Group

== Bibliography ==
Short Histories:

- The Indian Sappers and Miners, By Lieut.-Colonel E.W.C. Sandes D.S.O., M.C., R.E. (Ret.), Published by The Institution of Royal Engineers, Chatham, 1948. Extracts
- K.S. Calendar of battles, honours and awards : King George V's Own Bengal Sappers & Miners from 1803 to 1939, by Rhamat Ullan Khan, ca. 1944.
- History and digest of service of the 1st King George's Own Sappers & Miners. Roorkee : 1st King's Own Press, (ca. 1911)
- Regimental history of the King George's Own Bengal Sappers & Miners. Roorkee : KGO Sappers & Miners Press, 1937.
- Corps reunion and the unveiling of the war memorial. (Roorkee : King George V's own Bengal sappers and miners group, R.I.E),1927.
- History of the Corps of Royal Engineers, by Great Britain Army. Royal Engineers, Whitworth Porter. Published by Longmans, Green, 1952.
- The Bengal Sappers 1803–2003, by General Sir George Cooper GCB MC and Major David Alexander. ISBN 0-903530-24-4.
- The Military Engineer in India, by Lt. Col. E.W.C Sandes. Reprint 2001, Original 1933.ISBN 9781843420422.

First World War:

- Cunningham, A.H., A Short history of the Corps of King George's Own Bengal Sappers & Miners during the War, 1914-1918. (1930)

Second World War:

- Pearson, G., Brief history of the K.G.V's own Bengal Sappers and Miners Group, R.I.E., August 1939-July 1946. Roorkee : Pearson, 1947.
- Nevill, Hugh Lewis (1912). Campaigns on the North-west Frontier. J. Murray. ISBN 9780342594405.
