= Kafir Kot =

Ruined ancient temple complex in Pakistan

Coordinates: 32°30′0″N 71°20′0″E

- کافر کوٹ (Urdu) کافر کوټ (Pashto)
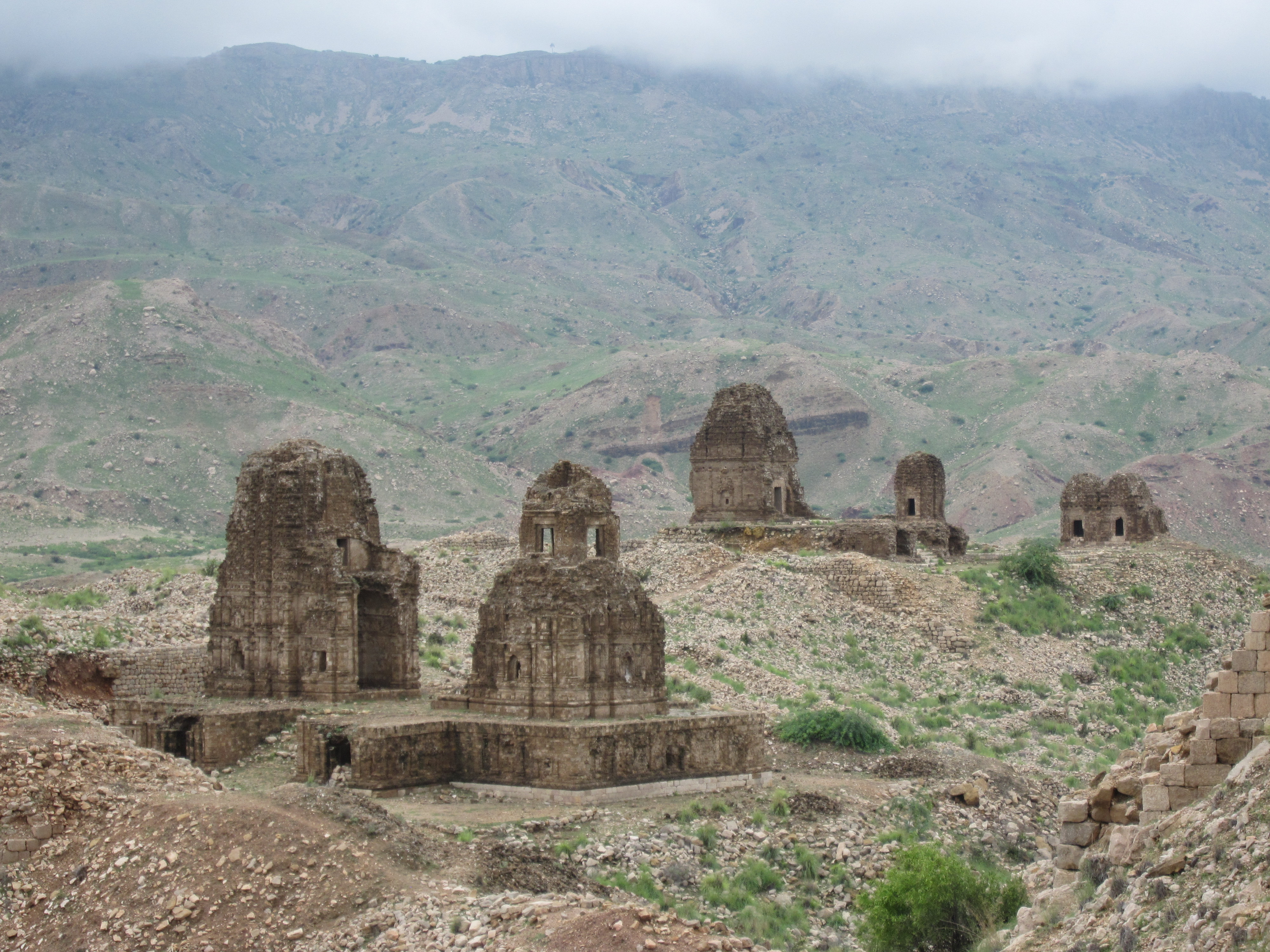
- View of the ruined temple complex at Kafir Kot, 2010

- Location within Khyber Pakhtunkhwa Location within Pakistan
- Type: Monastery
- Cultures: Hindu Shahi
- Location: Dera Ismail Khan District
- Region: Khyber Pakhtunkhwa

History
- Built: c. 7th century CE

Kafir Kot or Kafirkot (Urdu: کافر کوٹ; Pashto: کافر کوټ) is an ancient Hindu temple complex in the Dera Ismail Khan district of the Khyber Pakhtunkhwa province of Pakistan. It consists of the ruins of five temples and a large fort. It was an ancient Hindu fort with a famous temple inside its walls. The Kafir Kot complex in Khyber Pakhtunkhwa is often referred to as the "northern Kafir Kot" to distinguish it from the "southern Kafir Kot" that is located in the town of Bilot Sharif, approximately 35 kilometres (22 mi) to the south.

The remains of Sindhu temple (and the nearby ruins of Mari) are "indications of the existence of a Hindu civilization of considerable importance and antiquity" according to a 1915 issue of the District Gazetteer of Mianwali.

== Description ==
The ruin consists of two forts in the northwest of the district on small hills attached to the lower spurs of the Khasor range and overlooking the Indus river near the Chashma barrage. One lies a few miles south of Kundal and the other near Bilot.

According to the District Gazetteer of Mianwali:

These forts are of great antiquity and interest. Their main features are an outer defensive wall, consisting of rough blocks of stone, some of great size, and various groups of buildings resembling small Hindu temples and more or less carved. These are built of a curiously honey-combed drab-coloured stone not to be found in the adjacent hills, which is said to have been brought by river all the way from Khushalgarh. The area of the forts is considerable and they could have held a fairly large garrison. The only legends attached to them relate that they were occupied by the last of the Hindu Rajas, Til and Bil; but all traces of rulers and ruled are now lost.

The fort was destroyed by the Ghaznavids in the 11th century.

== Location ==
Bilot fort is the second fort situated next to the town of Bilot Sharif and about 55 km north of Dera Ismail Khan.

== Museum collections ==
Sculptures and architectural components from the site have been dispersed to museums across Pakistan and the rest of the world. One of the largest collections from Kafir Kot outside Pakistan is in the British Museum.

Images of Bilot Fort and the standing temple
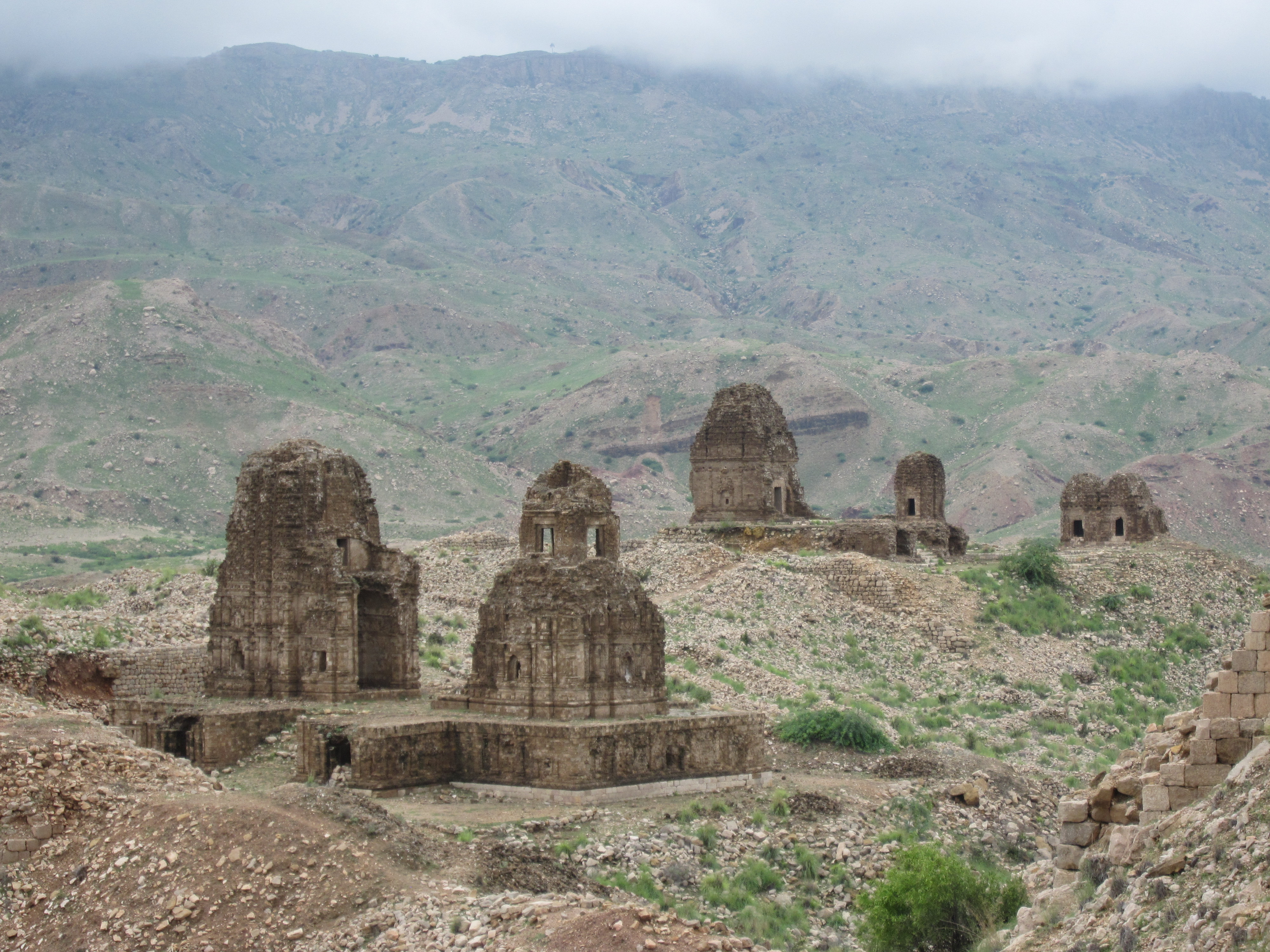
View of the Hindu Temples

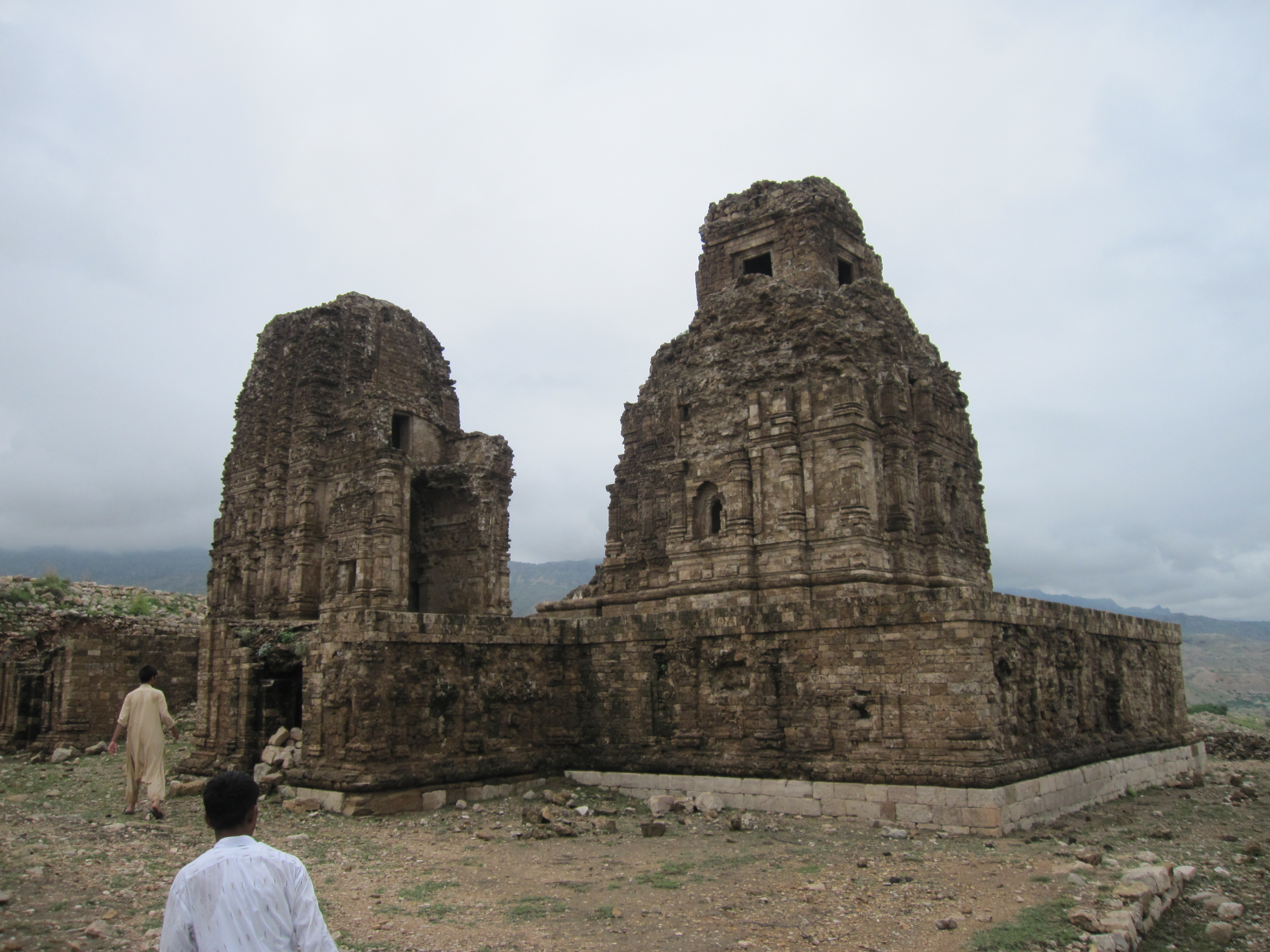
Closeup view of a temple

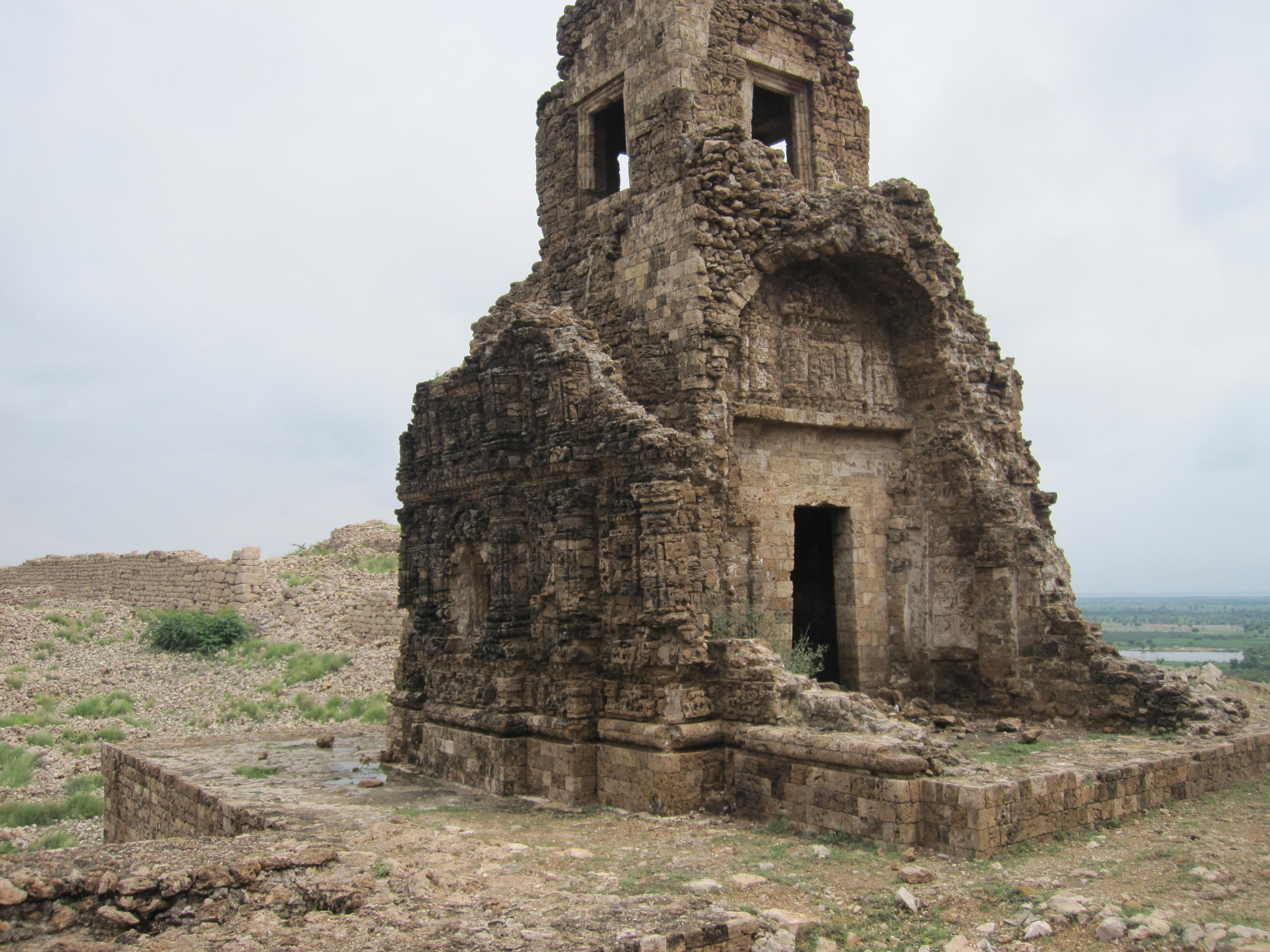
Some amount of restoration work has been done on the temple

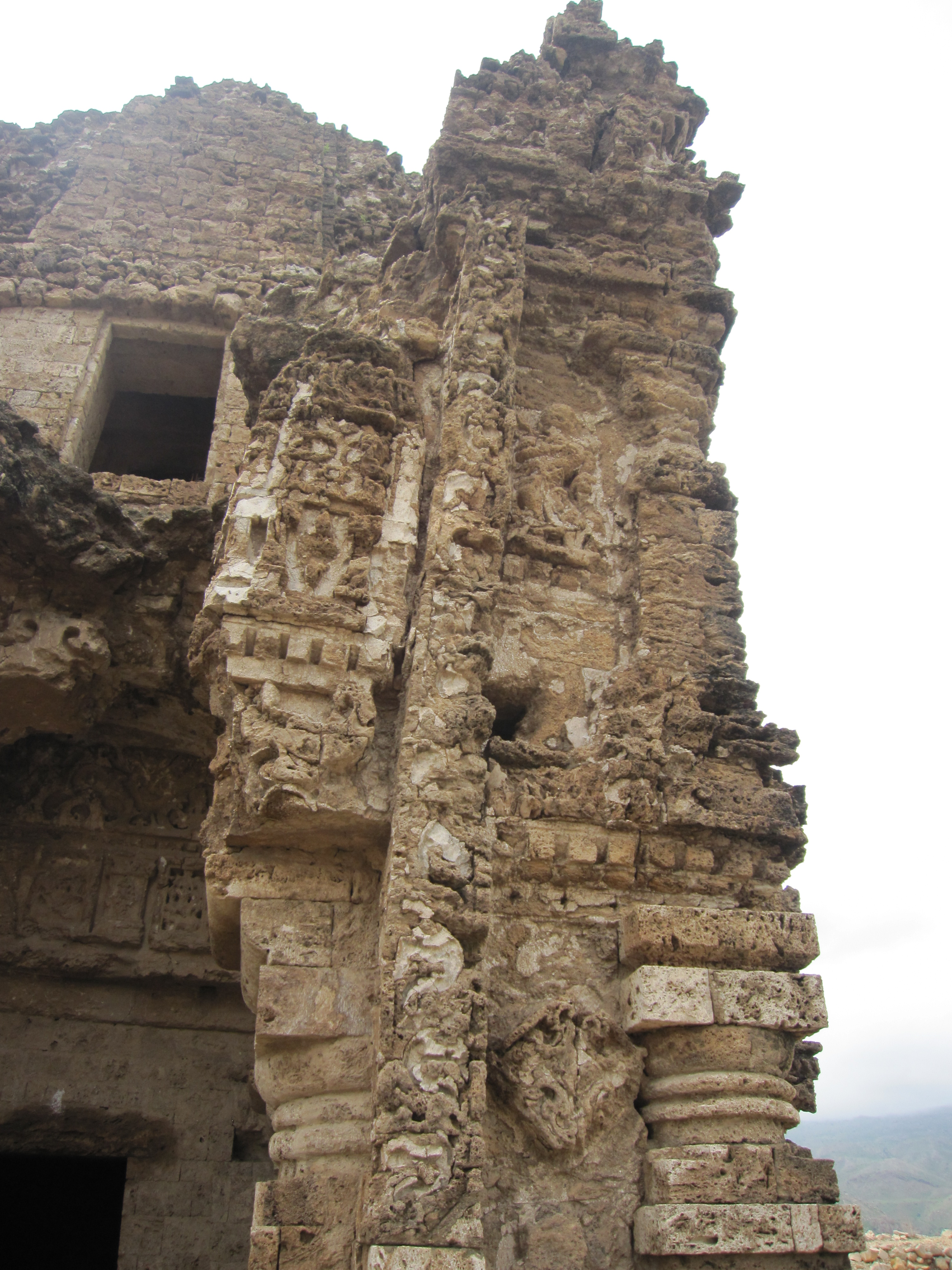
The walls of the temple are made of porous rock

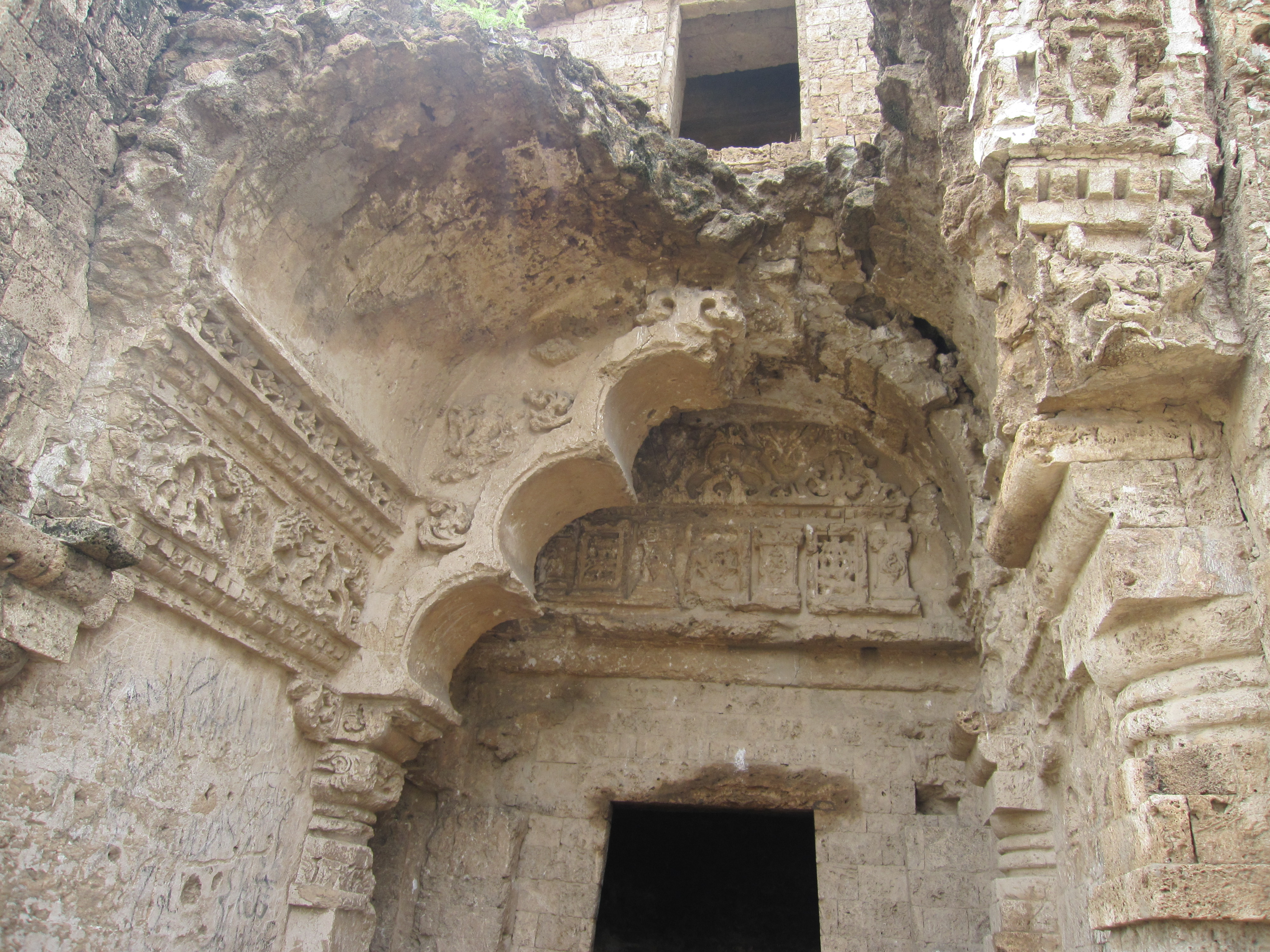
Fine work on the walls and ceilings

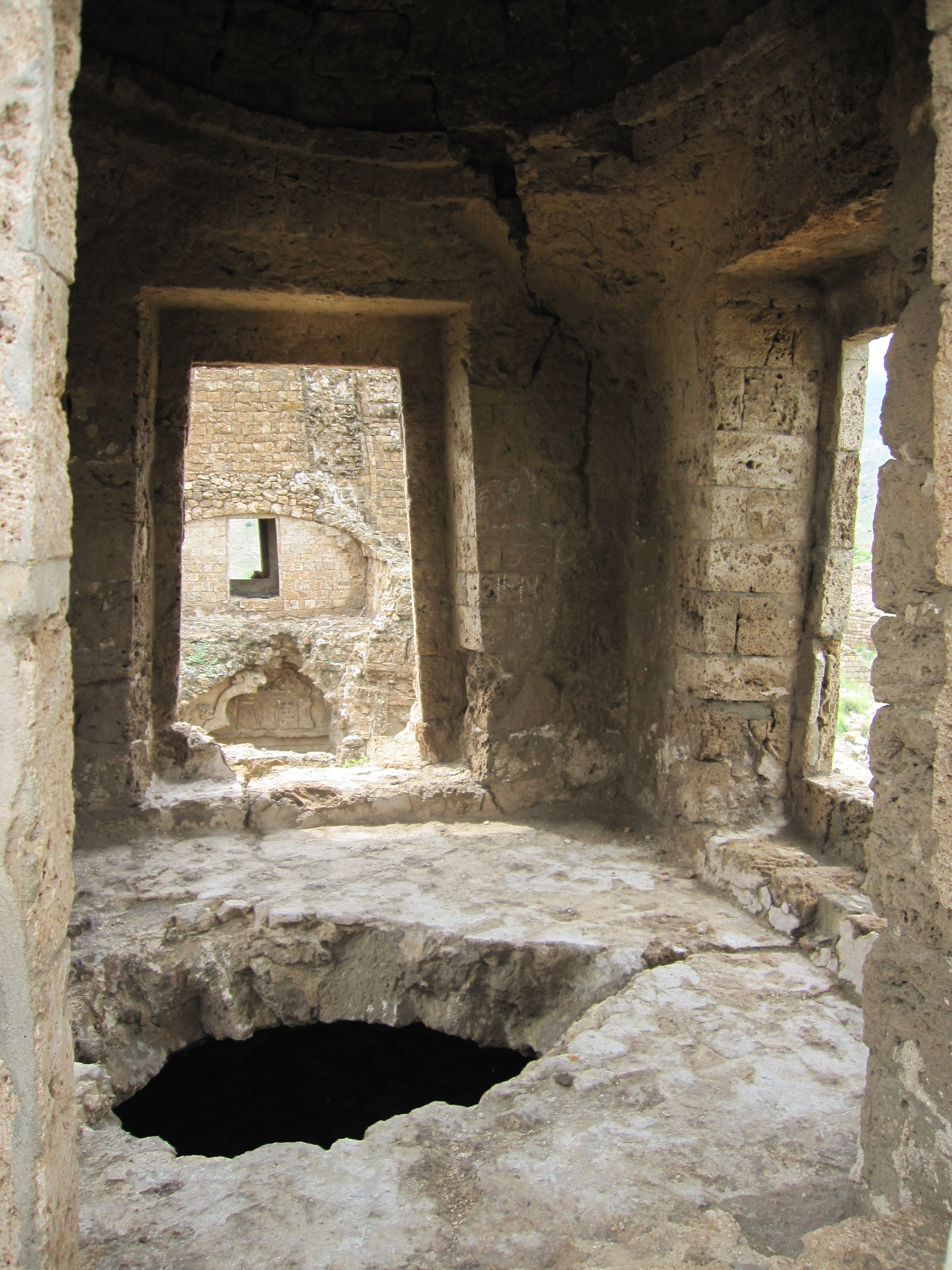
Stairs up the temple lead to an opening

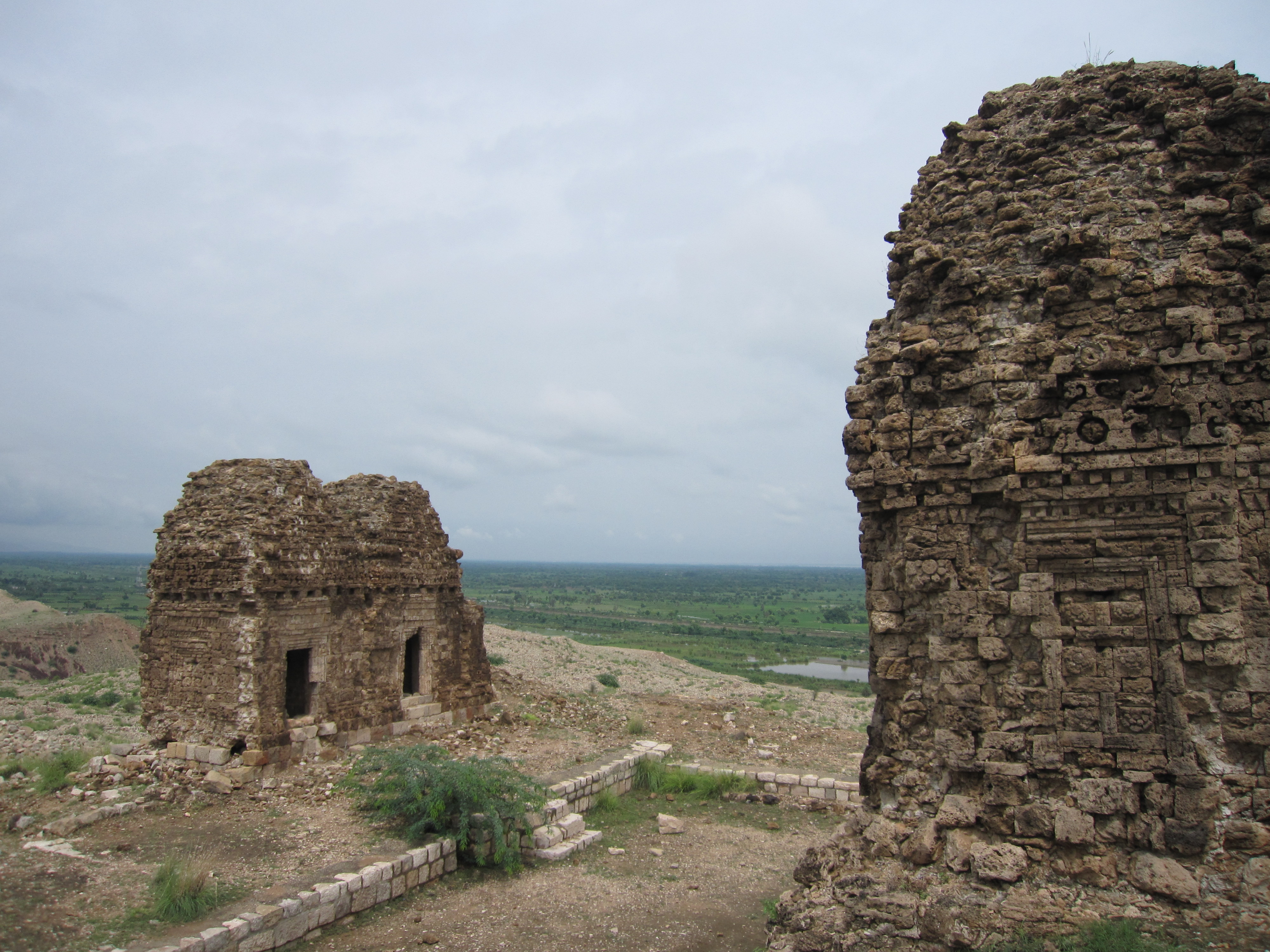
View from the upper floor of a temple

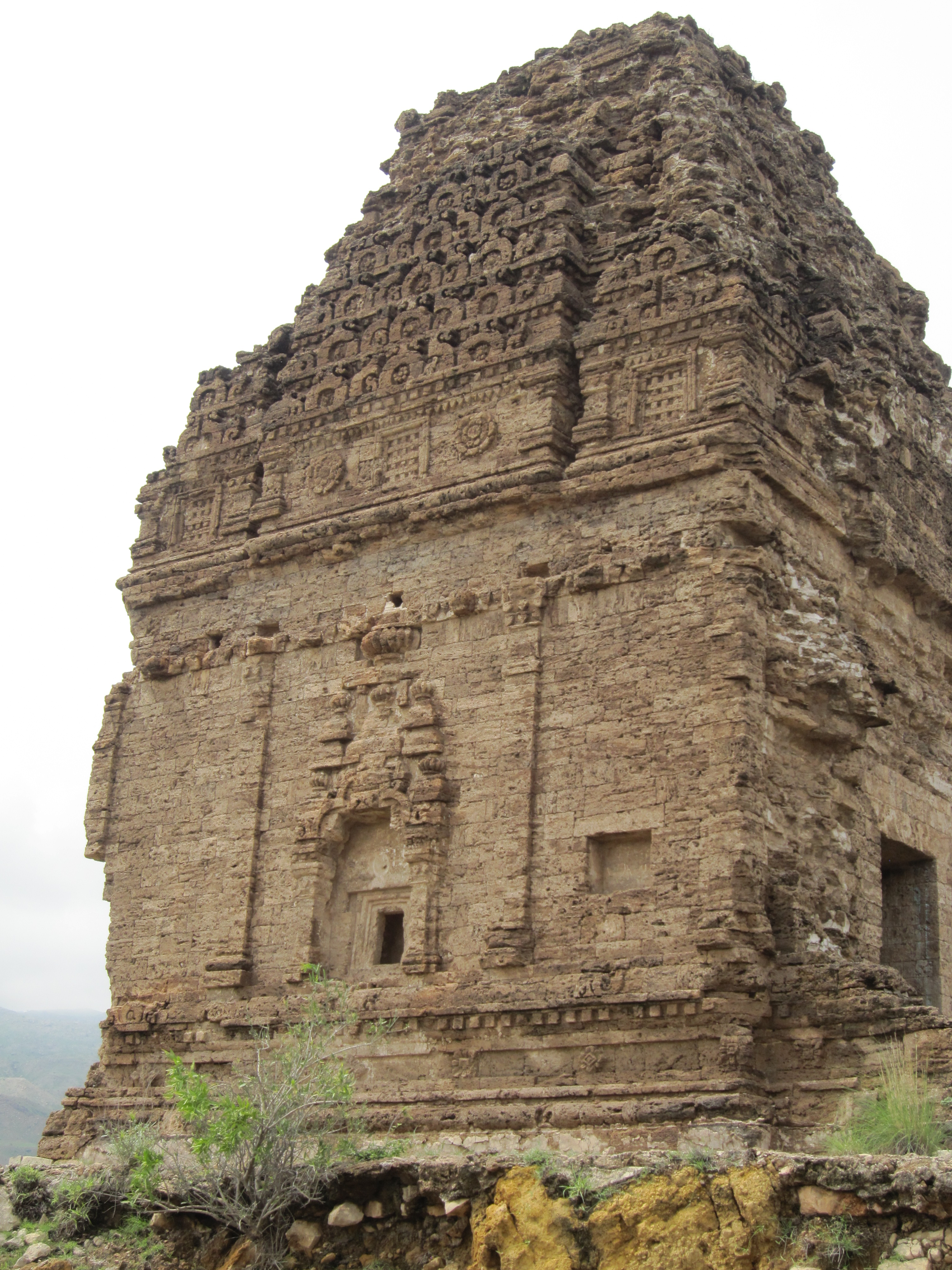
One of the well preserved temple rooms

== See also ==
- Hinduism in Khyber Pakhtunkhwa
- List of Hindu temples in Pakistan
- Hindu, Jain and Buddhist architectural heritage of Pakistan
