= Bilot Sharif =

- Town and union council
- Interactive map of Bilot Sharif
- Country: Pakistan
- Region: Khyber Pakhtunkhwa
- District: Paharpur District
- Time zone: UTC+5 (PST)

Bilot Sharif or Bilot is a town and union council of Paharpur District in Khyber Pakhtunkhwa province of Pakistan. It is located at 32°15′20″N 71°9′41″E and has an altitude of 180 metres (593 feet).

Bilot is a popular tourist destination of a pre-Islamic era, about 55 km from the Dera Ismail Khan city on Chashma road. The ruins are situated on a hill and are easily viewable from main road. Bilot is also famous for a Sufi shrine, which is why it is called "Bilot Sharif".

== See also ==
- Lieutenant Thomas Watson, VC
