= Mohmand campaign of 1897–1898 =

19th century British military campaign in India

First Mohmand campaign
Date	1897 to 1898
Location	Peshawar border of the North West Frontier
Result	British Indian victory

Belligerents
Mohmand tribe	(United Kingdom) British Empire: India

The First Mohmand campaign was a British military campaign against the Pashtun Mohmand tribe from 1897 to 1898.

== Background ==
The Mohmand are a Pashtun tribe who inhabit the hilly country to the north-west of Peshawar, in the North-West Frontier Province of what the British considered part of the British Empire, now Pakistan. British punitive expeditions had been sent against the Mohmand in 1851–1852, 1854, 1864, 1879, 1880, but the principal operations were those of 1897–1898.

The year 1897 witnessed an almost general outbreak among the tribes on the north-west frontier of India. The tribes involved were practically independent, but the new frontier arranged with the amir of Afghanistan, and demarcated by Sir Mortimer Durand's commission of 1893–1894 (the Durand Line), brought them within the British sphere of influence.

The fear of these tribes was annexation, and the hostility shown during the demarcation led to the Waziri expedition of 1894. Other causes, however, contributed to bring about the outbreak of 1897. The easy victory of the Turks over the Greeks in the Greco-Turkish War (1897) gave rise to excitement throughout the Muslim world, and the publication by the Amir of Afghanistan Abdur Rahman Khan, in his assumed capacity of king of Islam, of a religious work, in portions of which antipathy to Christians could be read, aroused militancy among the border Muslims.

The growing unrest was not recognized, and all appeared quiet, when, on 10 June 1897, a detachment of Indian troops escorting a British frontier officer was suddenly attacked during the mid-day halt in the Tochi Valley, where, since the Waziri expedition of 1894-95, certain armed posts had been retained by the government of India. On 29 July, with equal suddenness, the fortified posts at Chakdara and Malakand, in the Swat valley, which had been held since the Chitral expedition of 1895, were for several days fiercely assailed by the usually peaceful Swatis under the leadership of the "Mad Mullah" in the Siege of Malakand.

On 8 August the village of Shabkadar (Shankarghar), within a few miles of Peshawar, and in British territory, was raided by the Mohmand, while the Afridis besieged the fortified posts on the Samana ridge, which had been maintained since the expeditions of 1888 and 1891. Finally, the Afridis, within a few days, captured all the British posts in the Khyber Pass.

== Campaign ==
The Malakand Field Force commanded by Major-General Sir Bindon Blood was assembled at Nowshera. The post at Malakand was reached on 1 August, and on the following day Chakdara was relieved. The punishment of the Afridis was deferred till the preparations for the Tirah campaign could be completed. The Mohmand, however, could be immediately dealt with, and against them the two brigades of Sir Bindon Blood's division advanced from Malakand simultaneously with the movement of another division under Major-General Edmond Elles from Peshawar; it was intended that the two columns should effect a junction in Bajour.

About 6 September the two forces advanced, and Major-General Blood reached Nawagai on 14 September, having detached a brigade to cross the Rambat Pass. This brigade being sharply attacked in camp at Markhanai at the foot of the pass on the night of the 14th, was ordered to turn northwards and punish the tribesmen of the Mamund valley. On the 15th ,Brigadier-General (afterwards Major-General) Jeffreys camped at Inayat Killa, and on the following day he moved up the Mamund valley in three columns, which met with strong resistance. A retirement was ordered, the tribesmen following, and when darkness fell the general, with a battery and a small escort, was cut off, and with difficulty defended some buildings until relieved. The casualties in this action numbered 149. This partial reverse placed General Blood in a position of some difficulty. He determined, however, to remain at Nawagai, awaiting the arrival of General Elles, and sent orders to General Jeffreys to prosecute the operations in the Mamund valley.

From 18 to 23 September these operations were carried on successfully, several villages being burned, and the Mamunds were disheartened. Meanwhile, the camp at Nawagai was heavily attacked on the night of the 20th by about 4,000 men belonging to the Hadda Mullah's following. The attack was repulsed with loss, and on the 21st Generals Blood and Elles met at Lakarai. The junction having been effected, the latter, in accordance with the scheme, advanced to deal with the Upper Mohmand in the Jarobi and Koda Khel valleys, and they were soon brought to reason by his well-conducted operations. The work of the Peshawar division was now accomplished, and it returned to take part in the Tirah campaign. Its total casualties were about 30 killed and wounded.

On the 22nd, General Blood joined General Jeffreys, and on the 24th he started with his staff for Panjkora. On the 27th, General Jeffreys resumed punitive operations in the Mamund valley, destroying numerous villages. On the 30th, he encountered strong opposition at Agrah, and had 61 casualties. On 2 October General Blood arrived at Inayat Killa with reinforcements, and on the 5th the Mamunds tendered their submission. The total British loss in the Mamund valley was 282 out of a force which never exceeded 1,200 men. After marching into Buner, and revisiting the scenes of the Umbeyla campaign of 1863, the Malakand field-force was broken up on 21 January. The objects of the expedition were completely attained, in spite of the great natural difficulties of the country. The employment of imperial service troops with the Peshawar column marked a new departure in frontier campaigns.

== Participation of Winston Churchill ==
Winston Churchill accompanied the expedition as a second lieutenant and war correspondent, and wrote his first non-fiction book on it, The Story of the Malakand Field Force. In his despatches, Churchill described the Pathans as "vermin", and that they had "a strong aboriginal propensity to kill." Churchill vividly recorded his exploits in his My Early Life: "We proceeded systematically, village by village, and we destroyed the houses, filled up the wells, blew down the towers, cut down the great shady trees, burned the crops and broke the reservoirs in punitive devastation. So long as the villages were in the plain, this was quite easy. The tribesmen sat on the mountains and sullenly watched the destruction of their homes and means of livelihood….At the end of a fortnight the valley was a desert."

== See also ==
- Second Mohmand campaign
