= Siege of Malakand =

1897 siege of a British garrison by Afghan tribesmen

- Part of the Anglo-Afghan wars
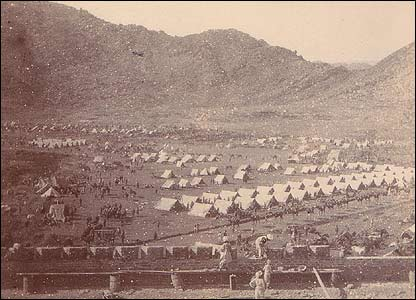
- South Malakand Camp, August 1897
Date	26 July – 2 August 1897
Location	Malakand, British India 34°35′47″N 71°55′52″E
Result	British victory

Belligerents
(United Kingdom) British Empire	(Emirate of Afghanistan) Pashtun tribes: Yusufzai; Mohmand; Utmankhel; Swat valley; Bunerwal (Note: 'Bunerwal' referred to the Yusufzai of the Buner Valley)

Commanders and leaders
William Hope Meiklejohn; Bindon Blood	Faqīr Saidullah

Strength
10,630 on 26 July 1897	10,000

Casualties and losses
3,000	3,890

The siege of Malakand was the 26 July – 2 August 1897 siege of the British garrison in the Malakand region of colonial British India's North West Frontier Province. The British faced a force of Pashtun tribesmen whose tribal lands had been bisected by the Durand Line, the 1,519 mile (2,445 km) border between Afghanistan and British India drawn up at the end of the Anglo-Afghan wars to help hold back what the British feared to be the Russian Empire's spread of influence towards the Indian subcontinent.

The unrest caused by this division of the Pashtun lands of Afghania led to the rise of Saidullah, a Pashtun faqir who led a great army of at least 10,000 tribesmen of the regional Yusufzai, Mohmand, Uthmankhel, Bunerwal, Swati tribes among others against the British garrison in Malakand. Although the British forces were divided among a number of poorly defended positions, the small garrison at the camp of Malakand South and the small fort at Chakdara were both able to hold out for six days against the much larger Pashtun army.

The siege was lifted when a relief column dispatched from British positions to the south was sent to assist General William Hope Meiklejohn, commander of the British forces at Malakand South. Accompanying this relief force were Second Lieutenant Winston Churchill, who later published his account as The Story of the Malakand Field Force: An Episode of Frontier War, and Major R. S. H. Moody, who was second in command of the Buffs (Royal East Kent Regiment), whom Churchill's book mentions.

== Background ==
Malakand District (red) in modern Khyber Pakhtunkhwa. Inset: Khyber Pakhtunkhwa in Pakistan.

The rivalry between the British and the Russian Empires, named "The Great Game" by Arthur Conolly, centred on Afghanistan during the late 19th century. From the British perspective, Russian expansion threatened to destroy the so-called "jewel in the crown" of the British Empire, India. As the Tsar's troops in Central Asia began to subdue one Khanate after another, the British feared that Afghanistan would become a staging post for a Russian invasion. Against this background the British launched the First Anglo-Afghan War in 1838, and attempted to impose a puppet regime under Shuja Shah. The regime was short-lived, however, and unsustainable without British military support. After the Russians sent an uninvited diplomatic mission to Kabul in July 1878, tensions were renewed and Britain demanded that the ruler of Afghanistan (Sher Ali Khan) accept a British diplomatic mission. The mission was turned back from the Khyber Pass in September, and by November the British and Afghans were at war.

After reaching a virtual stalemate with these two wars against the Afghans, the British imposed the Durand Line in 1893, which divided Afghanistan and British India (now Khyber Pakhtunkhwa and Balochistan provinces of Pakistan). Named after Sir Mortimer Durand, the foreign secretary of the British Indian government, it was agreed upon by the Emir of Afghanistan (Abdur Rahman Khan) and the representatives of the British Empire but deeply resented by the Afghans. Its intended purpose was to serve as a buffer zone to inhibit the spread of Russian influence down into British India.

=== Malakand Field Force ===
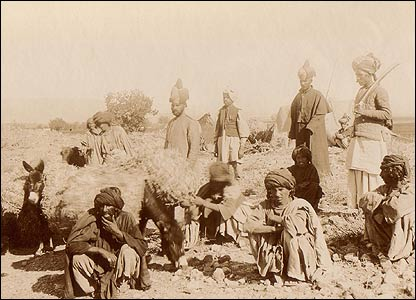
Pashtun tribesmen in the area around Malakand South

The British Malakand Field Force used the town of Nowshera as a base of operations. Nowshera was located south of the Kabul River "six hours by rail from Rawal Pindi". Commanded by Colonel Schalch, the base served as a hospital while the normal garrison was serving 47 miles (76 km) away at Malakand Pass in what was known as the Malakand South Camp. This force consisted of one British cavalry regiment, one Indian cavalry regiment and one Indian infantry battalion. Winston Churchill, who would accompany the relief force as a second lieutenant and war correspondent, described the camp as "...a great cup, of which the rim is broken into numerous clefts and jagged points. At the bottom of this cup is the 'crater' camp."

Churchill goes on to state that the camp was viewed as purely temporary and was indefensible, as a result of its cramped conditions and the fact that it was dominated by the surrounding heights. A nearby camp, North Malakand, was also established on the plains of Khar, intended to hold the large number of troops that were unable to fit into the main camp. Both of these positions were garrisoned for two years with little fear of attack by a 1,000 strong force. Officers brought their families, and the camp held regular polo matches and shooting competitions.

== Outbreak of the battle ==
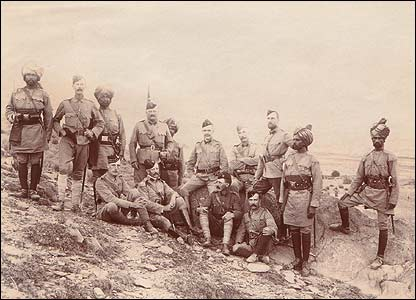
A mixture of British troops and Sikh sepoys fought in Malakand.

Towards 1897, news of unrest in the nearby Pashtun villages had reached the British garrisons in Malakand. Major Deane, the British political agent, noted the growing unrest within the Pashtun sepoys stationed with the British. His warnings were officially distributed to senior officers on 23 July; however, nothing more than a minor skirmish was expected. Rumours of a new religious leader, Saidullah the Sartor Fakir (also known as Mullah of Mastun), arriving to "sweep away" the British and inspire a jihad, were reportedly circulating the bazaars of Malakand during July. Saidullah became known to the British as "The Great Fakir", "Mad Fakir" or the "Mad Mullah", and by the Pashtuns as lewanai faqir, or simply, lewanai, meaning "love-intoxicated".

On July 26, while British officers were playing polo near camp Malakand North, indigenous spectators who were watching the match learned of an approaching Pashtun force and fled. Brigadier-General Meiklejohn, commander of the Malakand forces, was informed by Deane that "matters had assumed a very grave aspect" and that there were armed Pashtuns gathering nearby. Reinforcements from Mardan (32 miles (51 km) away) were requested, and Lieutenant P. Eliott-Lockhart departed at 1.30am. At 9.45pm, a final telegram was received informing the garrison that the Fakir had passed Khar and was advancing on Malakand. The telegram also stated that neither the levies nor the people would act against him, and that the hills to the east of the camp were covered with Pathans. Shortly after, the communication wire was cut.

=== Night of July 26/27 ===
==== South camp ====
During the night of 26 July, sometime after 10:00 pm, a messenger arrived with word that the enemy had reached the village of Khar, three miles from Malakand. A bugle call was immediately sounded within the camp. Lieutenant-Colonel McRae, commanding the 45th Sikhs, two units from the 31st Punjab Infantry, two Guns from No. 8 Mountain Battery and one Squadron from the 11th Bengal Lancers, was to have been sent to Amandara Pass – a distance of four miles – with orders to hold the position; however, the Pashtun column had already arrived at the South Malakand camp, surprising the British defenders, and began to open fire on the garrison with muskets. McRae immediately sent a small number of men under Major Taylor down a road from the "right flank" of the camp to ascertain the enemy's strength and location; McRae himself later followed with his own small group. Both parties aimed for a sharp turn in the oncoming road where, flanked by gorges, they hoped to hold the attacking force. McRae, with about 20 men, opened fire on the Pashtun tribesmen and began a fighting withdrawal 50 paces down the road before halting in an attempt to stop the attack. Taylor was mortally wounded in the incident and quickly died; McRae suffered a neck wound. Nevertheless, by 2:00 am reinforcements under the command of Lieutenant Barff had enabled the British to repel the Pashtun attack. The official dispatches of General Meiklejohn noted that:

There is no doubt that the gallant resistance made by this small body in the gorge, against vastly superior numbers, till the arrival of the rest of the regiment, saved the camp from being rushed on that side, and I cannot speak too highly of the behaviour of Lieutenant-Colonel McRae and Major Taylor on this occasion.

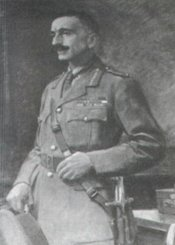
Edmund William Costello in later life as a Brigadier-General

Meanwhile, Pashtun forces had successfully assaulted the camp in three other locations, and the 24th Punjab Infantry's picket lines were quickly overrun. Pashtun sharpshooters occupying the nearby heights inflicted casualties throughout the night, and the bazaar and surrounding buildings were occupied. Other units of the 24th, under Lieutenant Skipton H. Climo, retook the area and held it until 10:45 pm, but under fire from sharpshooters they were driven back. The Pashtun forces broke through in a number of other locations. Lieutenant Watling commanding a group of British troops guarding the ammunitions stores at the Quarter Guard was wounded, losing the stores in the process. Meiklejohn led a small group of sappers, members of the 24th and Captain Holland, Lieutenant Climo from the earlier charge, and Lieutenant Manley to recapture the ammunition dump; Holland and the General were wounded, and the group severely depleted as it twice failed to retake the dump, but a third attempt by Climo proved successful. However, continuing crossfire from the enveloping Pashtun troops wounded a number of British officers, placing the command of the 24th with Climo. Towards 1:00 am on the morning of July 27, Lieutenant Edmund William Costello rescued a wounded havildar while under fire and was later awarded the Victoria Cross for his actions.

As the night wore on, reinforcements arrived from a nearby British hill fort which had as yet been ignored by the Pashtun forces. At 4:15 pm, the attacking forces withdrew with their dead and wounded. The British had lost a large number of officers wounded, and recorded 21 deaths amongst the sepoys.

==== North camp ====
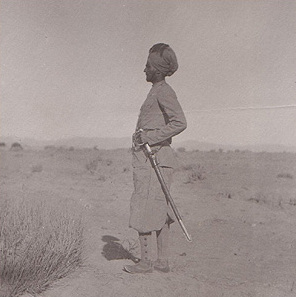
Indian sepoys from the 24th and 31st Punjab battalions received praise for their actions during the siege.

During the first night of the battle, the garrison at Malakand North had not seen much action despite being in the more exposed position, and had spent much of the night firing flares and manoeuvring artillery units. In response Meiklejohn ordered a reconnaissance of the vicinity, whereupon Major Gibbs, the commander of the force, encountered large groups of tribesmen in the valley. Subsequently, he was eventually ordered to collect his forces and stores from Malakand North, and transfer them into the southern camp.

=== July 27 ===
The last remaining forces from the now evacuated northern camp arrived in Malakand South at 8:30 am on the 27th, coinciding with the arrival of more Pashtun reinforcements. In Nowshera, the 11th Bengal Lancers awoke to news describing the situation, and, together with the 38th Dogras, the 35th Sikhs, No.1 and No.7 British Mountain Batteries, they set off to relieve the besieged garrison. Meanwhile, at Malakand South, fresh Pashtun attacks were repulsed by elements of the 24th led by Climo, whose unit captured a Pashtun standard.

At 7:30 pm the first of the British reinforcements arrived in the form of infantry from the Corps of Guides under Lieutenant Lockhart. The 45th Sikhs, supported by 100 men from the Guides and two guns, remained astride the main road into the camp, while the 31st Punjab Infantry held the centre; the 24th, under Climo, held the north edge of Malakand South. Subadar Syed Ahmed Shah of the 31st held the area around the bazaar, though the market place itself was left unoccupied. Around 8:00 pm the Pashtuns simultaneously attacked all the British positions where, "Many thousands of rounds were discharged" and a number of assaults repulsed. Subadar Syed Ahmed Shah and his forces defended their position for several hours, however the Pashtuns were eventually successful in undermining the walls and killing the defenders. The surviving sepoys and their leader were awarded the Indian Order of Merit. The 24th also repelled a number of charges, with VC recipient Costello receiving a wound in the arm. Despite the constant harassment by musket fire, rifle fire and a barrage of rocks, Climo successfully led a counter-attack with two companies, pushing the attacking forces back two miles. The British records for the night of July 27 record 12 killed among the sepoy ranks, as well as the wounding of Costello.

=== July 28 ===
The daylight hours of 28 July saw continuous fire from the Pashtun sharpshooters established in the hills surrounding Malakand South. The garrison surgeon, Lieutenant J.H. Hugo, treated a number of British casualties including an officer from the Guides. Despite further attacks during the night of July 28/29, the British recorded only two killed from the sepoy ranks, and the severe wounding of a Lieutenant Ford. Churchill records that Ford's bleeding artery was clamped shut by Hugo despite being under fire.

=== July 29 – July 31 ===
Having re-established communication on the morning of 29 July, the British garrison signalled the approaching relief forces via heliograph at 8:00 am – "Heavy fighting all night. Expect more tonight. What ammunition are you bringing? When may we expect you?" During the day, the Pashtuns prepared for another night attack while the British destroyed the bazaar and the regions previously defended, and lost, by Subadar Syed Ahmed Shah and the men of the 31st. Trees were also cut down to improve fields of fire, attracting further attention from the Pashtun sharpshooters. Major Stuart Beatsen arrived at 4:00 pm on the 29th with the 11th Bengal Lancers who had been summoned from Nowshera two days previous. The 35th Sikhs and 38th Dogras arrived at the mouth of the pass leading to Malakand South, but after losing between 19 and 21 of their ranks through heat exhaustion, they were forced to halt.

At 2:00 a.m. on 30 July, the Pashtuns launched another attack, during which Costello, and the Pashtun Mullah, were both wounded; the British also recorded one fatality among the sepoy contingent. That evening a further attack was repulsed by a bayonet charge of the 45th Sikhs. The following morning, on 31 July, the remainder of the 38th Dogras and 35th Sikhs entered Malakand South under the command of Colonel Reid, bringing with them 243 mules carrying 291,600 rounds of ammunition. But with their attention now drawn towards the nearby British outpost of Chakdara, attacks by the Pashtuns on Malakand South began to reduce until they ceased altogether. Churchill records a total of three British officers killed in action and 10 wounded, seven sepoy officers wounded, and 153 non-commissioned officers killed and wounded during the siege of Malakand South.

== Relieving Chakdara ==
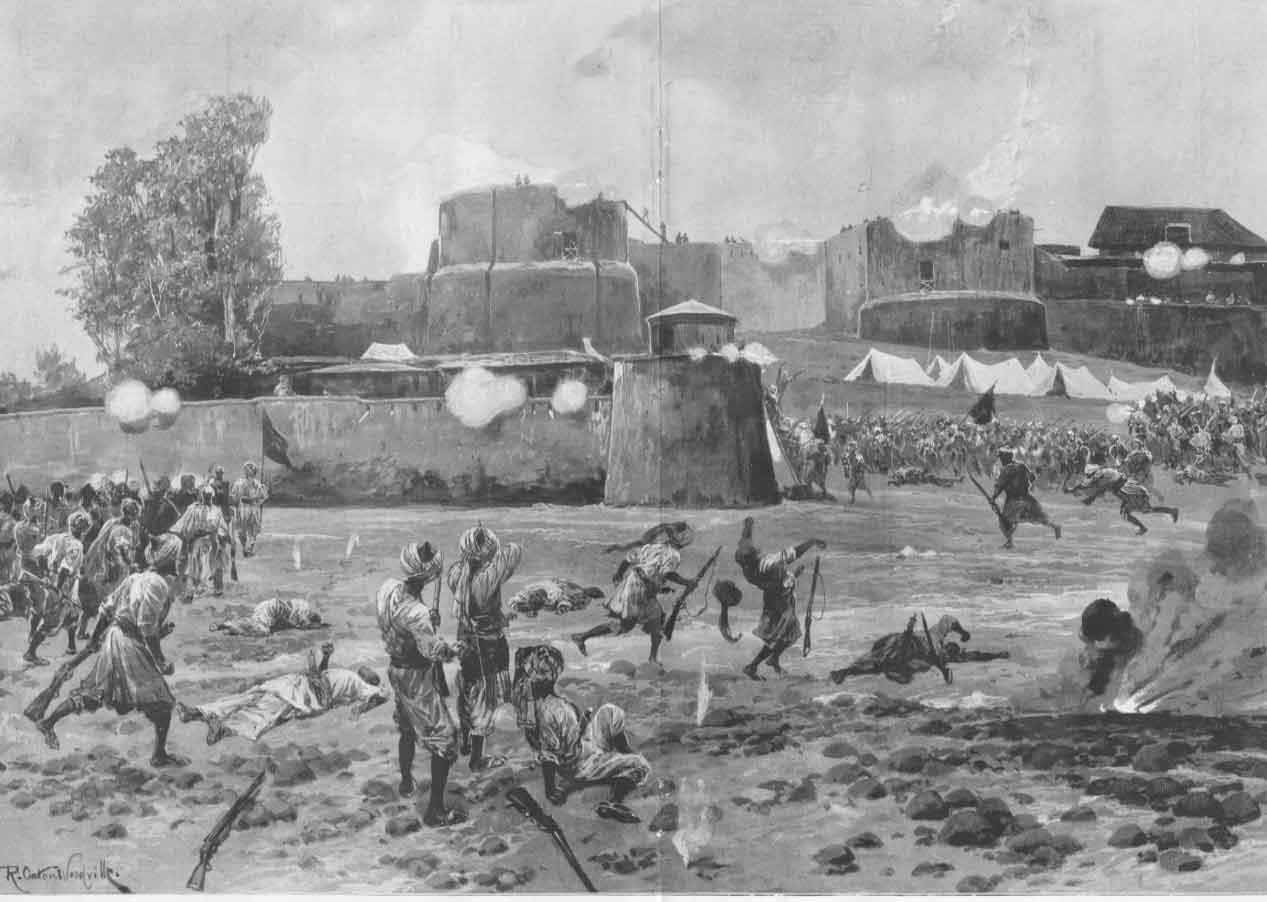
Pashtun tribesmen attacking a British–held fort in 1897

On 28 July, when word of the attacks was received, a division of "6,800 bayonets, 700 lances or sabres, with 24 guns" was given to Major-General Sir Bindon Blood with orders to hold "the Malakand, and the adjacent posts, and of operating against the neighbouring tribes as may be required." Blood arrived at Nowshera on 31 July to take command, and on 1 August he was informed that the Pashtun forces had turned their attention to the nearby British fort of Chakdara. This was a small, under-garrisoned fort with few supplies that had itself been holding out with 200 men since the first attacks in Malakand began, and had recently sent the signal "Help us" to the British forces. Blood reached Malakand at noon on the same day. While Blood and his relief force marched for Chakdara from the main camp at Nowshera, Meiklejohn set out from Malakand South with the 45th, 24th and guns from No. 8 Battery. An advance force of Guides cavalry under Captain Baldwin met with an enemy force along the road and were forced to retreat with two British officers and one sepoy officer wounded and 16 other ranks killed or wounded.

Following this failed attempt, Blood arrived and appointed Reid commander of the forces at Malakand South, giving command of the rescue force to Meiklejohn. The rescue column of 1,000 infantry, two squadrons from the 11th Bengal Lancers, two of the Guides cavalry, 50 sappers, two cannons and a hospital detail, rested on the night of August 1, despite a night attack by Pashtun forces. On the following day, the relief force advanced along the road to the abandoned Malakand North in order to avoid fire from the Pashtun sharpshooters who still occupied the heights around the Malakand South "cup". With low morale, the relief force assembled at 4:30 am on 2 August; however, with the use of diversionary attacks, they were successful in breaking out of the Pashtun encirclement without loss. This led to confusion amongst the Pashtun forces, "like ants in a disturbed ant–hill" as observed by Blood. The 11th Bengal Lancers and the Guides cavalry went on to relieve the threatened fort at Chakdara, while the 45th Sikhs stormed nearby Pashtun positions. The British recorded 33 casualties from the action on August 2.

== Aftermath ==
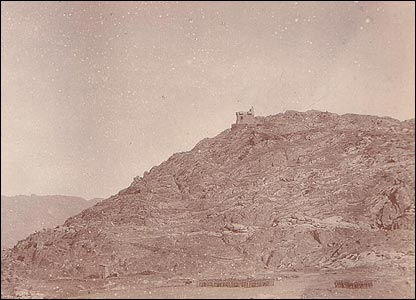
The outpost in Malakand from which Churchill saw action in the days following the siege.

The campaigns of the Malakand Field Force continued beyond the siege of Malakand South, North, and of the Chakdara fort. Immediately after the siege, two brigades of the British garrison were relocated to a new camp a few miles away to relieve the pressure in the overcrowded Malakand South. These received only light fire during 5 August; however, on 8 August, Saidullah rallied his surviving Pashtun forces and attacked the British garrison at Shabkadr fort near Peshawar. These attacks put the continued loyalty of friendly Pashtun levies guarding the British supply lines to Chitral at risk, thus endangering the supply convoys and their small escorts. In response, on 14 August, the British advanced farther into Pashtun territory and engaged a force of "several thousand" Pashtun tribesmen, with General Meiklejohn leading a flanking manoeuvre which split the Pashtun army in two, forcing it to pull back to Landakai. The British continued to engage Pashtun tribesmen throughout the day, suffering two officers and 11 other ranks killed.

The siege of Malakand was Winston Churchill's first experience of actual combat, which he later described in several columns for The Daily Telegraph, receiving £5 per column; these articles were eventually compiled into his first published book, The Story of the Malakand Field Force, beginning his career as a writer and politician. Of the book's publication he remarked, "[it] will certainly be the most noteworthy act of my life. Up to date (of course). By its reception I shall measure the chances of my possible success in the world." Of the siege of Malakand, and of the entire campaign against the Pashtun tribes in northern India, Churchill remarked that they were a period of significant "transition".

The War Office authorized the award of the clasp Malakand 1897 to the India Medal for those of the British and Indian armies who participated in this action. The battleground remained closed to visitors and under military control since the publication of Churchill's memoirs, and is the location of a Pakistani military base. However, in 2006 the Pakistani government began opening the area to foreign visitors.

== See also ==
- Bacha Khan
- Faqir of Ipi
  - Waziristan campaign
- Pashtunwali
- Tirah campaign
- Mohmand campaign
- Waziristan War
- Pashtunistan
