= The Story of the Malakand Field Force =

1898 book by Winston Churchill

- First edition
- Author: Winston Churchill
- Language: English
- Publisher: Longman
- Publication date: 1898
- Publication place: Great Britain
- Pages: 268
- ISBN: 978-0-486-47474-8
- OCLC: 319491196
- Dewey Decimal: 954.91/20355
- LC Class: DS392.N67 C48 2010

The Story of the Malakand Field Force: An Episode of Frontier War was an 1898 book written by Winston Churchill; it was his first published work of non-fiction.

The book describes a military campaign by the British army in what would shortly after become the North-West Frontier Province (now western Pakistan and eastern Afghanistan) in 1897. It is dedicated to General Bindon Blood.

The story of the campaign and Churchill's part in it is told in Churchill's First War: Young Winston and the Fight Against the Taliban (2013) by Con Coughlin.

Churchill was still developing his prose style and it has been noted that book's excessive use of adjectives and similes sometimes produces an “almost comic” effect.

== See also ==
- Siege of Malakand
- Battle of Chakdara

== Books ==
- Rhodes James, Robert (1970). Churchill: A Study in Failure, 1900–1939. Penguin Books.
