= Bindon Blood =

British Army officer (1842–1940)

General Sir Bindon Blood GCB GCVO
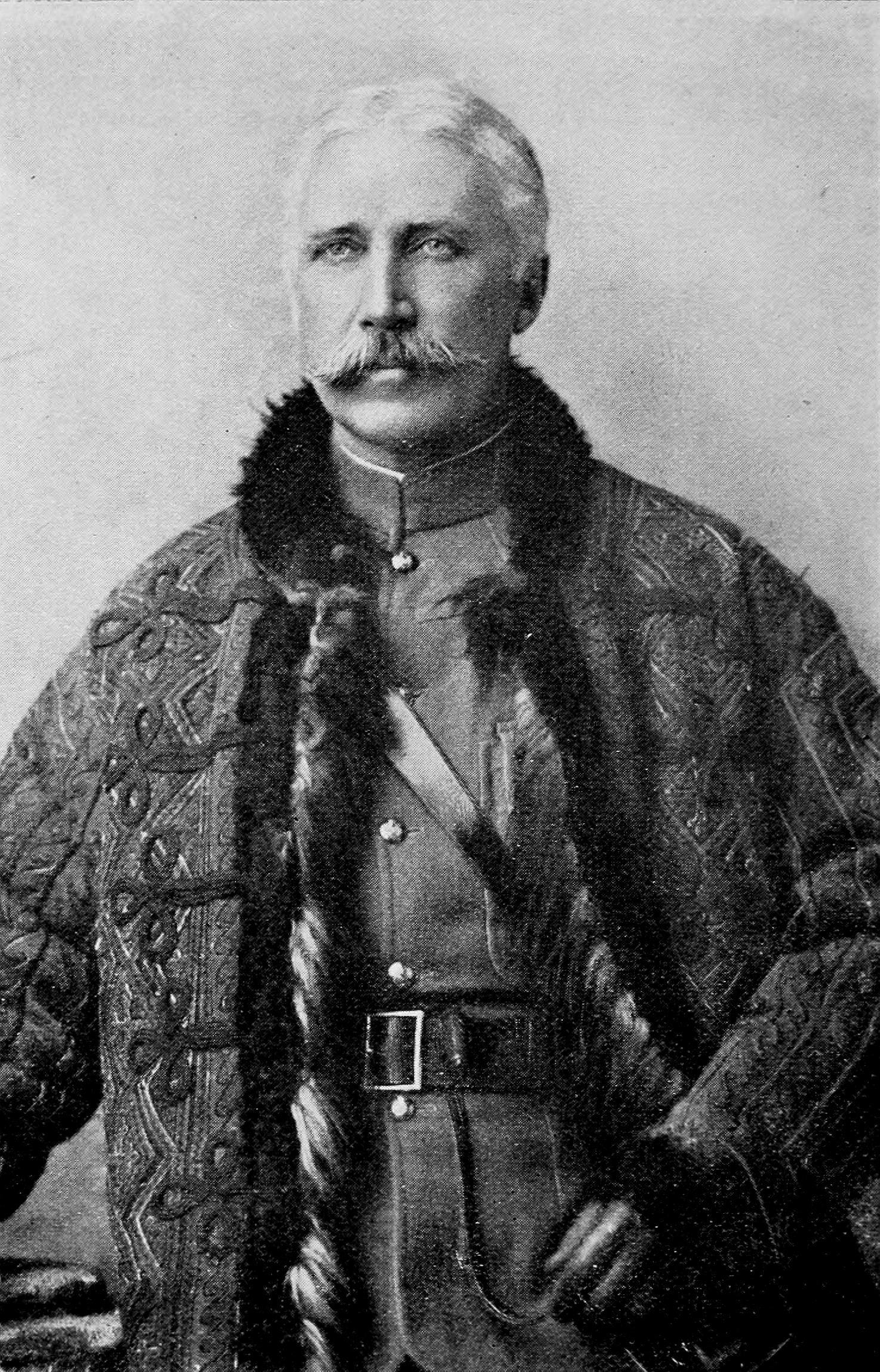
- Born: 7 November 1842; Jedburgh, Scotland
- Died: 16 May 1940 (aged 97); London, England
- Military career
- Allegiance: United Kingdom
- Branch: British Army
- Service years: 1860–1907
- Rank: General
- Commands: Northern Command, India; Meerut District; Buner Field Force; Malakand Field Force
- Conflicts: North-West Frontier; Anglo-Zulu War; Second Anglo-Afghan War; Anglo-Egyptian War: Battle of Tell El Kebir; Chitral Expedition; Siege of Malakand
- Awards: Knight Grand Cross of the Order of the Bath; Knight Grand Cross of the Royal Victorian Order; Mentioned in Despatches

General Sir Bindon Blood, GCB, GCVO (7 November 1842 – 16 May 1940) was a British Army commander who served in Egypt, Afghanistan, India, and South Africa.

== Military career ==
Bindon Blood was born near Jedburgh, Scotland, to William Bindon Blood (1817–1894) and Margaret Stewart (1820–1849). He was related to Colonel Thomas Blood, who attempted to steal the Crown Jewels in 1671. He attended the Royal School, Banagher, Queen's College, Galway, and the Addiscombe Military College. He was commissioned in 1860 in the Royal Engineers as a temporary lieutenant in charge of signalling and pontoon bridge construction in India, and for brief periods in Zululand and South Africa. Promoted to captain in 1873, he served with British forces in the North-West Frontier (Jowaki). In 1879 he was sent back to Africa for the Anglo-Zulu War. He went on to fight in the Second Anglo-Afghan War and the Battle of Tell El Kebir. By 1882 he was a brevet lieutenant colonel.

The following year, 1883, Blood married Charlotte E. Colvin, second daughter of Sir Auckland Colvin, a distinguished colonial administrator in India from a well-connected family. Then he returned to India and took command of the Bengal Sappers and Miners in 1885. After seven years he reached the rank of brigadier general, serving in the garrison at Rawalpindi, and then in the relief force known as the Chitral Expedition. He then commanded the Malakand Field Force and the Buner Field Force, relieving the garrison during the siege of Malakand. At the end of this command he was promoted to major general. He was appointed in command of the Meerut District, in the Bengal Command, on 22 September 1898.

Lord Kitchener succeeded as chief of command during the Second Boer War in late 1900, and requested Blood for service in South Africa, where he arrived in early March 1901. He spent six months in command of a division fighting in the Eastern Transvaal with the local rank of lieutenant general on the Staff from 1 April 1901. He was mentioned in the last despatch by Lord Kitchener dated 23 June 1902. In late September 1901 he returned to India to take up the position of Commander-in-Chief Punjab Command, where he arrived the following month. He kept the local rank of lieutenant general.

== Curzon incident ==
In 1902 General Blood clashed with the then Viceroy Lord Curzon over an incident involving the murder of an Indian cook by troopers of the 9th Lancers. An enquiry within the regiment was carried out negligently, failing to identify the guilty parties, and Blood made a complacent report suggesting that the soldiers were entirely innocent. The furious Curzon wrote a lengthy minute demolishing Blood's careless reasoning and imposed a collective punishment on the regiment.

== Retirement ==
In November 1907 Blood, promoted to general in December 1906, retired to London, where he continued to lead a very active life. He was made colonel-commandant of the Royal Engineers in 1914 and worked to recruit soldiers for the First World War. He was aged 94 when he was made Chief Royal Engineer (CRE) in 1936. He died in 1940, survived by his one daughter.

== Dedications ==
Winston Churchill, who served under Blood on the North-West Frontier in 1897, dedicated his first non-fiction book, The Story of the Malakand Field Force (1898), to

Major-General Sir Bindon Blood, K.C.B., under whose command the operations therein recorded were carried out; by whose generalship they were brought to a successful conclusion; and to whose kindness the author is indebted for the most valuable and fascinating experience of his life.

Colonel Richard Stanley Hawks Moody, who had been Blood's second-in-command of the 1st battalion of the 3rd Regiment of Foot within the Malakand Field Force, named his youngest daughter, Barbara Bindon, after Bindon. Moody also is mentioned in Chapter XII (At Inayat Kila) of Churchill's aforementioned book.

== Arms ==
Coat of arms of Bindon Blood
Notes Confirmed 21 January 1902 by Sir Arthur Edward Vicars, Ulster King of Arms Crest On a wreath of the colours issuant from waves of the sea a demi-figure of Neptune Proper. Escutcheon Quarterly first and fourth Argent a fess indented Gules between six martlets Sable (Blood) second and third Gules three escallops Argent within a bordure engrailed Or (Bindon). Motto Honor Virtutis Praemium

Honorary titles
Preceded by Philip Gordon Grant as Director of Fortifications and Works	Chief Royal Engineer; 1936–1940	Succeeded by Sir Ronald Charles
