= Bibliography of Winston Churchill =

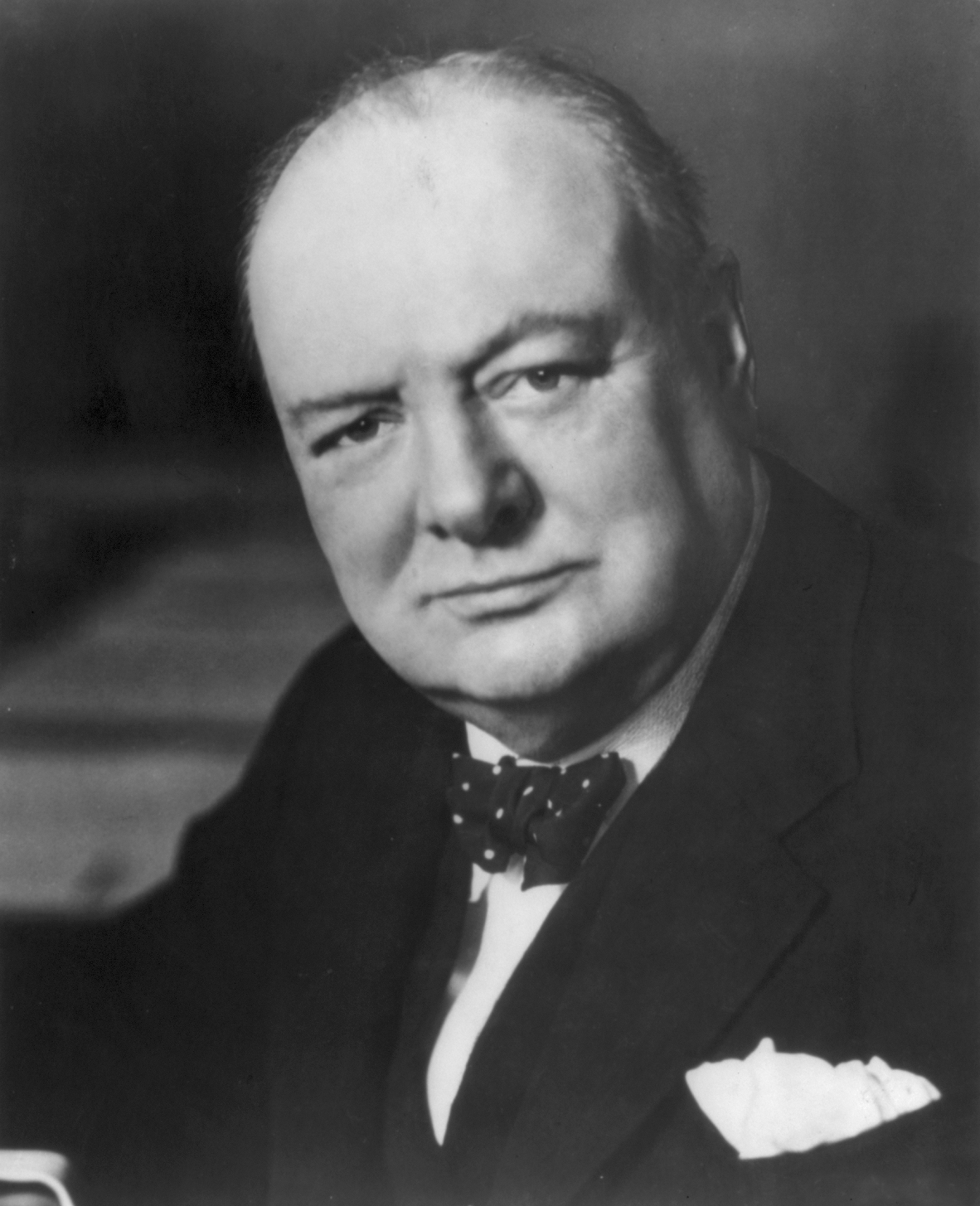
Churchill in 1941

The Bibliography of Winston Churchill includes the major scholarly and nonfiction books and scholarly articles on the career of Winston Churchill, as well as other online sources of information.

== Bibliography ==
=== Biographies ===
- Addison, Paul (2005). Churchill: The Unexpected Hero. Oxford: Oxford University Press. ISBN 978-01-99297-43-6.
- Arthur, Max (2015). Churchill – The Life: An authorised pictorial biography. London: Cassell. ISBN 978-1-84403-859-6.
- Best, Geoffrey (2001). Churchill: A Study in Greatness. London and New York: Hambledon and Continuum. ISBN 978-18-52852-53-5.
- Cannadine, David. The Aristocratic Adventurer, (Penguin, 2005).
- Catherwood, Christopher. Winston Churchill: A Reference Guide to His Life and Works (Rowman & Littlefield, 2020), a biography by topics, arranged alphabetically. online
- Charmley, John. Churchill: The End of Glory. A Political Biography (1993), a revisionist book that emphasizes his political weaknesses and mistakes down to 1945. He argues that Churchill led Britain into bankruptcy, lost the British Empire, and opened the way for American world domination. See also online book review
- Cooper, Esmond. Winston Churchill for Kids: The Story of Bravery, Dreams, and Dedication (2023), for ages 3 to 7.
- Haffner, Sebastian (2003). Churchill. John Brownjohn (translator). London: Haus. ISBN 978-19-04341-07-9. OCLC 852530003.
- Hoare, Jerry, and Ellen Labrecque. Who Was Winston Churchill? (Penguin Young Readers Group, 2015) for ages 8 to 12.
- Jackson, Ashley. Churchill (2011) online, a major biography
- Jenkins, Roy. Churchill (2001), a major biography. online
- Keegan, John. Winston Churchill (Penguin, 2007), brief life.
- Lovell, Mary S. (2011). The Churchills. London: Little Brown Book Group. ISBN 978-07-48117-11-6.
- Manchester, William (1983). The Last Lion: Winston Spencer Churchill; Visions of Glory: 1874–1932. Boston: Little, Brown, and Company.
  - Manchester, William The Last Lion: Winston Spencer Churchill Alone 1932–1940 (Little, Brown, 1988).
  - Manchester, William The Last Lion: Winston Spencer Churchill: Defender of the Realm, 1940–1965 (2012). Paul Reid, who completed the volume after Manchester's death in 2004, listed as co-author.
- Millard, Candice. Hero of the Empire: The Boer War, a Daring Escape, and the Making of Winston Churchill (2016)
- Pearson, John. Citadel of the Heart, Winston and the Churchill Dynasty. (Pan, 1993)
- Pelling, Henry. Winston Churchill (1974) online, a major scholarly biography
- Rhodes James, Robert (1970). Churchill: A Study in Failure 1900–1939. London: Weidenfeld & Nicolson. ISBN 978-02-97820-15-4.
- Robbins, Keith (2014) [1992]. Churchill: Profiles in Power. London and New York: Routledge. ISBN 978-13-17874-52-2.
- Roberts, Andrew (2018). Churchill: Walking with Destiny. London: Allen Lane. ISBN 978-11-01980-99-6., a major scholarly biography.
- Shelden, Michael. Young Titan: The Making of Winston Churchill (Simon & Schuster 2013), 1900 to 1914.
- Tariq, Ali. Winston Churchill: His Times, His Crimes (Verso Books 2022)

==== Official biographies by Randolph Churchill and Martin Gilbert ====
The Churchill family controls many of the documents and has authorized an 8-volume official biography. It was started by his son Randolph Churchill (1911–1968) and finished after his death by Martin Gilbert (1936–2015), a scholar at Oxford. It included "Companion volumes" filled with original sources. The total is 28 volumes with over 30,000 pages and many illustrations. The detail is so thorough and minute that the broader context is obscure and hard to follow.

- Churchill, Randolph. Winston S. Churchill: Volume One: Youth, 1874–1900 (1966) online
- Churchill, Randolph. Winston S. Churchill: Volume Two: Young Statesman, 1901–1914 (1967)
- Gilbert, Martin (1991). Churchill: A Life. London: Heinemann. ISBN 978-04-34291-83-0.; condensed in one volume.
  - Winston S. Churchill: The Challenge of War 1914–16 (1971), online
  - Winston S. Churchill: The Stricken World 1917–22 (1975) online as "The World in Torment"
  - Winston S. Churchill: Prophet of Truth 1922–1939 (1979) online
  - Winston S. Churchill: Finest Hour, 1939–1941 (1983) online
  - Winston S. Churchill: Road to Victory, 1941–1945 (1986) online
  - Winston S. Churchill: Never Despair 1945–1965 (1988) online
- Gilbert, Martin. In search of Churchill : a historian's journey (1994) online
- Gilbert, Martin. Churchill and America (Simon and Schuster, 2005)
- Gilbert, Martin. The will of the people : Winston Churchill and parliamentary democracy (2006)
- Gilbert, Martin. Churchill & the Jews: A Lifelong Friendship (2007).

===== Companion volumes =====
These books contain a very large collection of primary sources, especially memoranda written by Churchill, letters to him and from him, and notes of meetings he attended. Very few of the Companion books are online.

- Churchill, Randolph, ed. Winston S. Churchill: Volume One Companion, 1874–1900 (1966, in two parts)
- Churchill, Randolph, ed. Winston S. Churchill: Volume Two Companion, 1900–1914 (1969, in three parts). vol 2 part 2 1907–1911 online
- Gilbert, Martin (1972a), Winston S Churchill, vol. Three, Documents (in two volumes)
- —— (1977a), Winston S Churchill, vol. Four, Documents (in three volumes)
- —— (1979b), Winston S Churchill, vol. The Exchequer Years, 1922–1929, Documents
- —— (1981a), Winston S Churchill, vol. The Wilderness Years, 1929–1935, Documents
- —— (1982a), Winston S Churchill, vol. The Coming of War, 1936–1939, Documents
- —— (1993a), The Churchill War Papers, vol. One: Winston S Churchill, 'At The Admiralty': September 1939 – May 1940
- —— (1995a), The Churchill War Papers, vol. Two: Winston S Churchill, 'Never Surrender': May – December 1940
- —— (2000a), The Churchill War Papers, vol. Three: Winston S Churchill, 'The Ever-Widening War': 1941
- —— (2014), The Churchill Documents, vol. Seventeen: Testing Times: 1942
- ——; Arnn, Larry (2015), The Churchill Documents, vol. Eighteen: One Continent Redeemed, January–August 1943
- ——; Arnn, Larry (2017), The Churchill Documents, vol. Nineteen: Fateful Questions, September 1943 – April 1944
- ——; Arnn, Larry (2018), The Churchill Documents, vol. Twenty: Normandy and Beyond, May–December 1944
- ——; Arnn, Larry (2019), The Churchill Documents, vol. Twenty-One: The Shadows of Victory, January–July 1945
- ——; Arnn, Larry (2019), The Churchill Documents, vol. Twenty-Two: Leader of the Opposition, August 1945–October 1951
- ——; Arnn, Larry (2019), The Churchill Documents, vol. Twenty-Three: Never Flinch, Never Weary, November 1951–February 1965

=== World War II ===
See also the biographies above, especially Jackson (2011), Jenkins (2001), Pelling (1974) and Roberts (2018).

- Barker, Elisabeth. Churchill and Eden at war (1978), foreign policy. online
- Bell, Christopher M. “The ‘Singapore Strategy’ and the Deterrence of Japan: Winston Churchill, the Admiralty and the Dispatch of Force Z.” English Historical Review 116#467 (2001) pp. 604–634. online
- Ben-Moshe, Tuvia. “Winston Churchill and the ‘Second Front’: A Reappraisal.” Journal of Modern History, 62#3 (1990), pp. 503–537. online
- Bercuson, Holger, and David; Herwig. One Christmas in Washington: The Secret Meeting Between Roosevelt & Churchill That Changed the World (2005) online
- Bernstein, Barton J. “The Uneasy Alliance: Roosevelt, Churchill and the Atom Bomb, 1940–1945.” Western Political Quarterly 29#2 (1976) pp. 202–230.
- Berthon, Simon. Allies at War: The Bitter Rivalry Among Churchill, Roosevelt, and De Gaulle (2001) online; focus on France.
- Biddle, Tami Davis. “Democratic Leaders and Strategies of Coalition Warfare: Churchill and Roosevelt in World War II.” in The New Makers of Modern Strategy: From the Ancient World to the Digital Age, edited by Hal Brands, (Princeton UP, 2023), pp. 569–592. online
- Charmley, John. Churchill's Grand Alliance: The Anglo-American Special Relationship, 1940–1957: (1995).
- Cowman, Ian. "Main fleet to Singapore? Churchill, the admiralty, and force Z." Journal of Strategic Studies 17.2 (1994): 79–93.
- Dilks, David. Churchill and company: Allies and rivals in war and peace (Bloomsbury, 2012) online
- Dockter, A. Warren. "Franklin D. Roosevelt and Winston Churchill: Power relations." in The Palgrave Handbook of Presidents and Prime Ministers From Cleveland and Salisbury to Trump and Johnson (Springer International Publishing, 2022) pp. 133–155.
- Feis, Herbert. Churchill-Roosevelt-Stalin: The war they waged and the peace they sought (Princeton UP, 1957) online
- Fenby, Jonathan. Alliance: The Inside Story of How Roosevelt, Stalin and Churchill Won One War and Began Another (2007), popular history. online
- Gorodetsky, Gabriel. “The Origins of the Cold War: Stalin, Churchill and the Formation of the Grand Alliance.” The Russian Review, 47#2 (1988), pp. 145–170. online, argues Churchill was hostile toward Communism in World War II
- Hastings, Max. Finest Years. Churchill as Warlord, 1940–45 (HarperCollins. 2009)
- Hermiston, Roger. All Behind You, Winston: Churchill's Great Coalition 1940–45 (2016) online.
- Kimball, Warren F. Forged in War: Roosevelt, Churchill, and the Second World War (1997).
- Kitchen, Martin. "Winston Churchill and the Soviet Union during the Second World War." The Historical Journal 30.2 (1987): 415–436. online
- Lash, Joseph P. Roosevelt and Churchill, 1939–1941: The partnership that saved the West (2021) online.
- Lukacs, John. Blood, toil, tears, and sweat: the dire warning (2008) background
- Maguire, Lori. " 'We Shall Fight': A Rhetorical Analysis of Churchill's Famous Speech." Rhetoric & Public Affairs 17.2 (2014): 255–286, online
- Meacham, Jon. Franklin and Winston: A Portrait of a Friendship (Granta Books, 2016).
- Parker, RAC. Churchill and Appeasement (2000). Parker is unusual among historians in his sympathy for Churchill's claim that Britain and France could have deterred Hitler by forming a "Grand Alliance" with the USSR.
- Peden, G.C. Churchill, Chamberlain and Appeasement (Cambridge UP, 2022).
- Pitt, Barrie. Churchill and the Generals (1981). Written to accompany a 1979 series of TV plays.
- Preston, Diana. Eight Days at Yalta: How Churchill, Roosevelt, and Stalin Shaped the Post-war World (Atlantic Monthly Press, 2020).
- Ramsden, John. "Churchill and the Germans." Contemporary British History 25.01 (2011): 125–139. online
- Resis, Albert (April 1978). "The Churchill-Stalin Secret "Percentages" Agreement on the Balkans, Moscow, October 1944". American Historical Review. 83 (2): 368–387. doi:10.2307/1862322. JSTOR 1862322.
- Reynolds, David. "The ‘Big three’ and the division of Europe, 1945–48: An overview." Diplomacy and Statecraft 1.2 (1990): 111–136.
- Reynolds, David. From World War to Cold War: Churchill, Roosevelt, and the International History of the 1940s (Oxford UP, 2006).
- Roberts, Andrew. Masters and commanders : how four titans won the war in the west, 1941–1945 (2009)
- Schneer, Jonathan. Ministers at War: Winston Churchill and His War Cabinet (Basic Books, 2015).
- Shakespeare, Nicholas. SIx Minutes in May (2018). Study of the Norway Campaign, the subsequent Commons debate, and the emergence of Churchill as Prime Minister.
- Stafford, David. Churchill and Secret Service (1999) online
- Stafford, David. Roosevelt and Churchill : men of secrets (2000) online
- Thompson, Neville. The Third Man: Churchill, Roosevelt, Mackenzie King, and the Untold Friendships that Won WWII (2021), on Canada's role.
- Todman, Daniel. Britain's War: Into Battle, 1937–1941 (Oxford UP, 2016)
  - Todman, Daniel. Britain's War: A New World: 1942–1947 (Oxford UP, 2020); in-depth scholarly survey.
- Toye, Richard. "This famous island is the home of freedom’: Winston Churchill and the battle for ‘European civilization." History of European Ideas 46.5 (2020): 666–680. online
- Woodward, Llewellyn. British foreign policy in the Second World War (1962), summary of his five volume history. online

=== Specialty studies ===
- Addison, Paul. "The political beliefs of Winston Churchill." Transactions of the Royal Historical Society 30 (1980): 23–47. online
- Addison, Paul. Churchill on the home front, 1900–1955 (Faber & Faber, 2013).
- Ball, Stuart. "Churchill and the Conservative party." Transactions of the Royal Historical Society 11 (2001): 307–330. online
- Bédarida, François. "Winston Churchill's image of France and the French." Historical Research 74.183 (2001): 95–105.
- Bell, Christopher M. Churchill and the Dardanelles (2017), focus on the Gallipoli campaign's origins and execution. online
- Bell, Christopher M. Churchill and Sea Power (Oxford UP, 2013).
  - Bell, Christopher M. (2011). "Sir John Fisher's Naval Revolution Reconsidered: Winston Churchill at the Admiralty, 1911–1914". War in History. 18 (3): 333–356. doi:10.1177/0968344511401489. S2CID 159573922. A reply to the writings of Nicholas Lambert (not to be confused with Andrew Lambert), who argues that the pre-WW1 Royal Navy was beginning to reorient itself towards a strategy of torpedo boats and economic warfare rather than traditional big-gun battleship warfare.
- Bew, Paul. Churchill and Ireland (2016).
- Blake, Robert; Louis, Wm. Roger, eds. (1993). Churchill: A Major New Reassessment of His Life in Peace and War. Oxford: Oxford University Press. ISBN 978-01-98203-17-9. OCLC 30029512. collection of essays on aspects of his career and opinions
- Gilbert, Bentley B. "Winston Churchill versus the Webbs: The origins of British unemployment insurance." American Historical Review 71.3 (1966): 846–862. online
- Carlton, David. Churchill and the Soviet Union (2000).
- Catherwood, Christopher. Churchill's Folly: How Winston Churchill Created Iraq. Carroll and Graf, US (2004)
- Catterall, Peter. "Churchill as Chancellor of the Exchequer (1924–9) and the return to the gold standard." (Churchill Archive. 2013). online
- Cohen, Michael J. (2013). Churchill and the Jews, 1900–1948. Routledge. ISBN 978-1-135-31906-9.
- Dawson, R. MacGregor. “The Cabinet Minister and Administration: Winston S. Churchill at the Admiralty 1911–1915.” Canadian Journal of Economics and Political Science (1940), pp. 325–358.
- D'Este, Carlo. Warlord: Churchill At War 1874–1965 (2009).
- Douglas, R. M. (2009). "Did Britain Use Chemical Weapons in Mandatory Iraq?". The Journal of Modern History. 81 (4): 859–887. doi:10.1086/605488. S2CID 154708409.
- Faught, C. Brad. Churchill and Africa: Empire, Decolonisation and Africa. (Pen and Sword, 2023).
- Franklin, Mark, and Matthew Ladner. “The Undoing of Winston Churchill: Mobilization and Conversion in the 1945 Realignment of British Voters.” British Journal of Political Science, vol. 25, no. 4, 1995, pp. 429–452. online explores why voters turned against him in 1945.
- Harbutt, Fraser J. The iron curtain: Churchill, America, and the origins of the Cold War (Oxford UP, 1988).
- Herman, Arthur. Gandhi & Churchill: The Epic Rivalry That Destroyed an Empire & Forged Our Age (2008), on India
- Hermiston, Roger. All Behind You, Winston – Churchill's Great Coalition, 1940–45 (2016).
- Holmes, Richard. In The Footsteps of Churchill (2005).
- Hughes, E. J. “Winston Churchill and the Formation of the United Nations Organization.” Journal of Contemporary History, vol. 9, no. 4, 1974, pp. 177–194. online, on his support for League of Nations and UN.
- James, Lawrence. Churchill and empire : a portrait of an imperialist (2013)
- Jeffrey, Marjorie. "Science, democracy, and peace: Churchill on society and statesmanship, in the Fulton Address and beyond." Journal of Transatlantic Studies 14 (2016): 326–339.
- Jordan, Anthony J. (1995). Churchill, A Founder of Modern Ireland. Westport, Mayo: Westport Books. ISBN 978-09-52444-70-1.
- Kersaudy, Francois. Churchill and de Gaulle (1981).
- Liddle, Andrew. Churchill: the Scottish Years (2024) study of his time as MP for Dundee 1908 - 1922
- McKercher, B.J.C., and Antoine Capet, eds. Winston Churchill: at war and thinking of war before 1939 (Routledge, 2019).
- Moritz, Edward Jr. "Winston Churchill – Prison Reformer". Historian (1958). 20 (4): 428–440. online
- Reagles, David, and Timothy Larsen. "Winston Churchill and Almighty God". Historically Speaking (2013)14 (5): 8–10. doi:10.1353/hsp.2013.0056. On his religion.
- Roskill, Stephen. Churchill and the Admirals (1977). A classic, but some of his arguments need to be checked against more recent work, e.g. Christopher Bell.
- Ryan, Henry B. “A New Look at Churchill’s ‘Iron Curtain’ Speech.” The Historical Journal, vol. 22, no. 4, 1979, pp. 895–920. online
- Seligmann, Matthew S. Rum, Sodomy, Prayers, and the Lash Revisited: Winston Churchill and Social Reform in the Royal Navy, 1900–1915 (Oxford UP, 2018).
- Smith, Gary Scott. Duty and Destiny: The Life and Faith of Winston Churchill (Eerdmans, 2021), focus on religion.
- Soames, Mary. Clementine Churchill (1981) author was the daughter of Winston and his wife Clementine Churchill. online
- Soames, Mary (1990). Winston Churchill: His Life as a Painter. Boston, Massachusetts: Houghton Mifflin. ISBN 978-03-95563-19-9.
- Stafford, David. Oblivion Or Glory: 1921 and the Making of Winston Churchill (Yale UP, 2019) The year in which Churchill buried his mother Jenny, inherited property in Ireland and, as Colonial Secretary, played an important role in the creation of modern Ireland and the Middle East.
- Stewart, Graham. Burying Caesar: Churchill, Chamberlain and the Battle for the Tory Party (1998). A study of the inter-war period.
- Toye, Richard. Lloyd George and Churchill: Rivals for Greatness (Macmillan, 2007) online
- Toye, Richard, ed. Winston Churchill: Politics, Strategy and Statecraft (Bloomsbury, 2017).
- Toye, Richard. “Winston Churchill’s ‘Crazy Broadcast’: Party, Nation, and the 1945 Gestapo Speech.” Journal of British Studies 49#3 (2010), pp. 655–680. online
- Toye, Richard. Churchill's empire : the world that made him and the world he made (2010)
- Ward, Jeremy K. “Winston Churchill and the ‘Iron Curtain’ Speech.” The History Teacher 1#2 (1968), pp. 5–13, 57–63. online
- Watry, David M. Diplomacy at the Brink: Eisenhower, Churchill, and Eden in the Cold War (LSU Press, 2014).
- Watson, Alan. Churchill's Legacy: Two Speeches to Save The World (2016). Study of the Iron Curtain Speech at Fulton, Missouri and the Zurich speech calling for a United States of Europe, both delivered in 1946.
- Young, John W. “Churchill’s ‘No’ to Europe: The ‘Rejection’ of European Union by Churchill's Post-War Government, 1951–1952.” The Historical Journal, 28#4 (1985), pp. 923–937. online

=== Historiography and memory ===
- Adams, Edward (2011). Liberal Epic: The Victorian Practice of History from Gibbon to Churchill. Charlottesville: U of Virginia Press. ISBN 978-08-13931-45-6.
- Addison, Paul. "The Three Careers of Winston Churchill." Transactions of the Royal Historical Society 11 (2001): 183–199. on his reputation in three areas. online
- Addison, Paul. Churchill: The Unexpected Hero (Oxford UP, 2006)
- Alldritt, Keith. Churchill the Writer: His Life as a Man of Letters (Hutchinson, 1992)
- Ashley, Maurice. Churchill as Historian (Scribner's, 1968). online
- Barrett, Buckley B. Churchill: a concise bibliography (Greenwood, 2000)
- Black, Jonathan. Winston Churchill in British art, 1900 to the Present Day: the Titan with many faces (Bloomsbury, 2017).
- Cannadine, David. In Churchill's Shadow: Confronting the Past in Modern Britain (Oxford UP, 2003) .
- Clarke, Peter. Mr. Churchill's Profession: Statesman, Orator, Writer. (2012) Study of his writing career and earnings.
- Eade, Charles. Churchill by his Contemporaries. (Hutchinson, 1953)
- Fielding, Steven et al. The Churchill Myths (Oxford UP, 2020) about mistaken memories and deliberate distortions designed to support particular policies.
- Gilbert, Martin. In search of Churchill : a historian's journey (1994) online
- Lee, Peter, and Colin McHattie. "Winston Churchill and the bombing of German cities, 1940‒1945." Global War Studies 13.1 (2016): 47–69, on the debate among historians. online
- Lewis, Gordon K. "Mr. Churchill as Historian." The Historian 20.4 (1958): 387–414. online
- Lough, David. No More Champagne (2015). Study of Churchill's finances, including literary earnings. Lough was granted unprecedented access to his private banking records.
- Prior, Robin. Churchill's World Crisis as History (1983) analysis of his First World War memoirs
- Ramsden, John. Man of the Century: Winston Churchill and his Legend since 1945 (Columbia UP, 2002) online how Churchill was perceived in major countries
- Rasor, Eugene L. (2000). Winston S. Churchill, 1874–1965: A Comprehensive Historiography and Annotated Bibliography. Westport, Connecticut: Greenwood Press. ISBN 978-03-13305-46-7.
- Reynolds, David. In Command of History: Churchill Fighting and Writing the Second World War (Random House, 2005). review of this book analysis of his Second World War memoirs
- Reynolds, David. "Churchill’s Writing of History: Appeasement, Autobiography and The Gathering Storm." Transactions of the Royal Historical Society 11 (2001): 221–247. online
- Reynolds, David. "Official history: how Churchill and the cabinet office wrote The Second World War." Historical Research 78.201 (2005): 400–422. online
- Rose, Jonathan. The literary Churchill: author, reader, actor (Yale UP, 2014).
- Rubin, Louis D. "Did Churchill ruin 'the great work of time'? thoughts on the new British revisionism." Virginia Quarterly Review 70.1 (1994): 59–78. , focus on John Charmley (1993), who argues Churchill bankrupted Britain, lost the British Empire, and helped US gain world domination.
- Taylor, A.J.P., et al. Churchill Revised: A Critical Assessment (Dial Press, 1969). online
- Toye, Richard, ed. Winston Churchill: Politics, Strategy, and Statecraft (2017). essays by scholars.
- Toye, Richard. The roar of the lion: the untold story of Churchill's World War II speeches (Oxford UP, 2013) online.
- Weidhom, Manfred. Sword and Pen: A Survey of the Writings of Sir Winston Churchill (U of New Mexico Press, 1974).
- Woods, Frederick. A bibliography of the works of Sir Winston Churchill (1963) online
- Wrigley, Chris. Winston Churchill: A biographical companion (Bloomsbury, 2002). online
- Zoller, Curt, and Richard M. Langworth. Annotated bibliography of works about Sir Winston S. Churchill (Routledge, 2015) online.

=== Primary sources ===
See also the 23 Companion volumes listed above.

- Carter, Violet Bonham, Baroness Asquith of Yarnbury. Winston Churchill as I knew him. (Eyre & Spottiswoode, 1965)
- Kimball, Warren F. ed. Churchill & Roosevelt - The Complete Correspondence: Volume 1: Alliance Emerging (HarperCollins, 1967) online
  - Kimball, Warren F. ed. Churchill & Roosevelt – The Complete Correspondence: Volume 2: Alliance Forged (HarperCollins, 1967)
  - Kimball, Warren F. ed. Churchill & Roosevelt – The Complete Correspondence: Volume 3: Alliance Declining (1984)
- Leutze, James. “The Secret of the Churchill-Roosevelt Correspondence: September 1939 – May 1940.” Journal of Contemporary History, 10#3 (1975), pp. 465–491. online, argues FDR wanted to enter the war.
- Langworth, Richard (2008). Churchill by Himself. London: Ebury Press.
- Loewenheim, Francis L. et al. eds. Roosevelt and Churchill, their secret wartime correspondence (1975)
- Montague Browne, Anthony (1995). Long Sunset: Memoirs of Winston Churchill's Last Private Secretary. Ashford: Podkin Press. ISBN 978-09-55948-30-5.
- Reynolds, David, and Vladimir Pechatnov, eds. The Kremlin Letters: Stalin’s Wartime Correspondence with Churchill and Roosevelt (Yale UP, 2018)
- Rhodes James, Robert, ed. Winston S. Churchill: His Complete Speeches 1897–1963 (8 vols. Chelsea House, 1974).
- Sand, G. W. Defending the West: The Truman-Churchill Correspondence, 1945–1960 (Praeger, 2004).
- Soames, Mary (1998). Speaking for Themselves: The Personal Letters of Winston and Clementine Churchill. London: Doubleday. ISBN 978-03-85406-91-8.
- Soames, Mary (2012). A Daughter's Tale: The Memoir of Winston and Clementine Churchill's Youngest Child. London: Transworld Publishers Limited. ISBN 978-05-52770-92-7.

== Links to his books ==
- The Story of the Malakand Field Force (1898)
- Savrola (1899, novel)
- The River War (1899)
- London to Ladysmith via Pretoria (1900)
- Ian Hamilton's March (1900)
- Lord Randolph Churchill (1906)
- My African Journey (1909)
- Liberalism and the Social Problem (1909)
- The World Crisis (1923–1931, five volumes)
- My Early Life (1930)
- India (1931)
- Thoughts and Adventures (1932)
- Marlborough: His Life and Times (1933–1938, four volumes)
- Great Contemporaries (1937)
- Arms and the Covenant (1938)
- Step by Step (1939)
- Into Battle (1941)
- The Unrelenting Struggle (1942)
- The End of the Beginning (1943)
- Onwards to Victory (1944)
- The Dawn of Liberation (1945)
- Victory (1946)
- Secret Session Speeches (1946)
- The Sinews of Peace (1948)
- Painting as a Pastime (1948)
- "Are There Men on the Moon?" (1942, essay)
- The Second World War (1948–1953, six volumes)
- A History of the English-Speaking Peoples (1956–1958, four volumes)
- The Collected Essays of Sir Winston Churchill (1975)

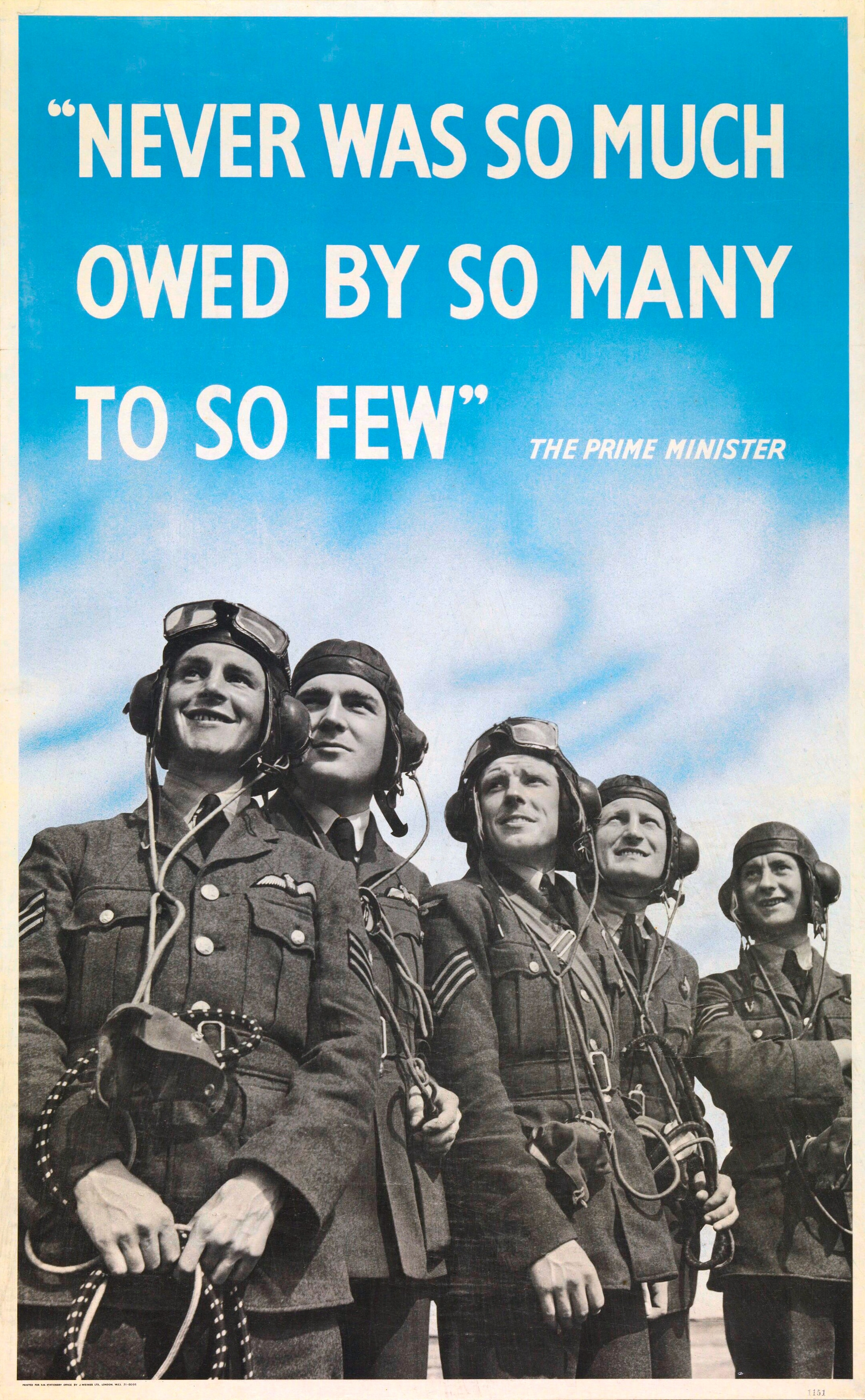
World War II poster containing the famous lines by Churchill and members of Bomber command

== Links to his speeches ==
- "A total and unmitigated defeat"
- "Blood, toil, tears and sweat"
- "Be ye men of valour"
- "We shall fight on the beaches"
- "This was their finest hour"
- "Never was so much owed by so many to so few"
- "Iron Curtain"

== Online books ==
- Books written by Churchill at Project Gutenberg, online
- Works by or about Bibliography of Winston Churchill at the Internet Archive
- Works by Bibliography of Winston Churchill at LibriVox (public domain audiobooks)

== Online recordings ==
- EarthStation1: Winston Churchill Speech Audio Archive.
- Amateur colour film footage of Churchill's funeral from the Imperial War Museum.

== Online museums, archives and libraries ==
- Portraits of Winston Churchill at the National Portrait Gallery, London
- Hansard 1803–2005: contributions in Parliament by Winston Churchill
- Records and images from the UK Parliament Collections.
- The International Churchill Society (ICS).
- Imperial War Museum: Churchill War Rooms. Comprising the original underground War Rooms preserved since 1945, including the Cabinet Room, the Map Room and Churchill's bedroom, and the new Museum dedicated to Churchill's life.
- Churchill's First World War from the Imperial War Museum.
