= FrenchEntrée Magazine =

FrenchEntrée Magazine launched in 2001 and was formerly known as French Magazine. The magazine was bought from Merricks Media in 2009 by Horizon New Media, which was later renamed France Media Group. It is published bi-monthly and has been edited by Justin Postlethwaite since 2004.

The magazine celebrated its tenth anniversary in 2011. It is aimed at English-speaking Francophiles and is supported by FrenchEntrée.com - the online guide to French property, French lifestyle and holidays in France.
