= Francophile =

Strong interest in or love of French people, culture, and history

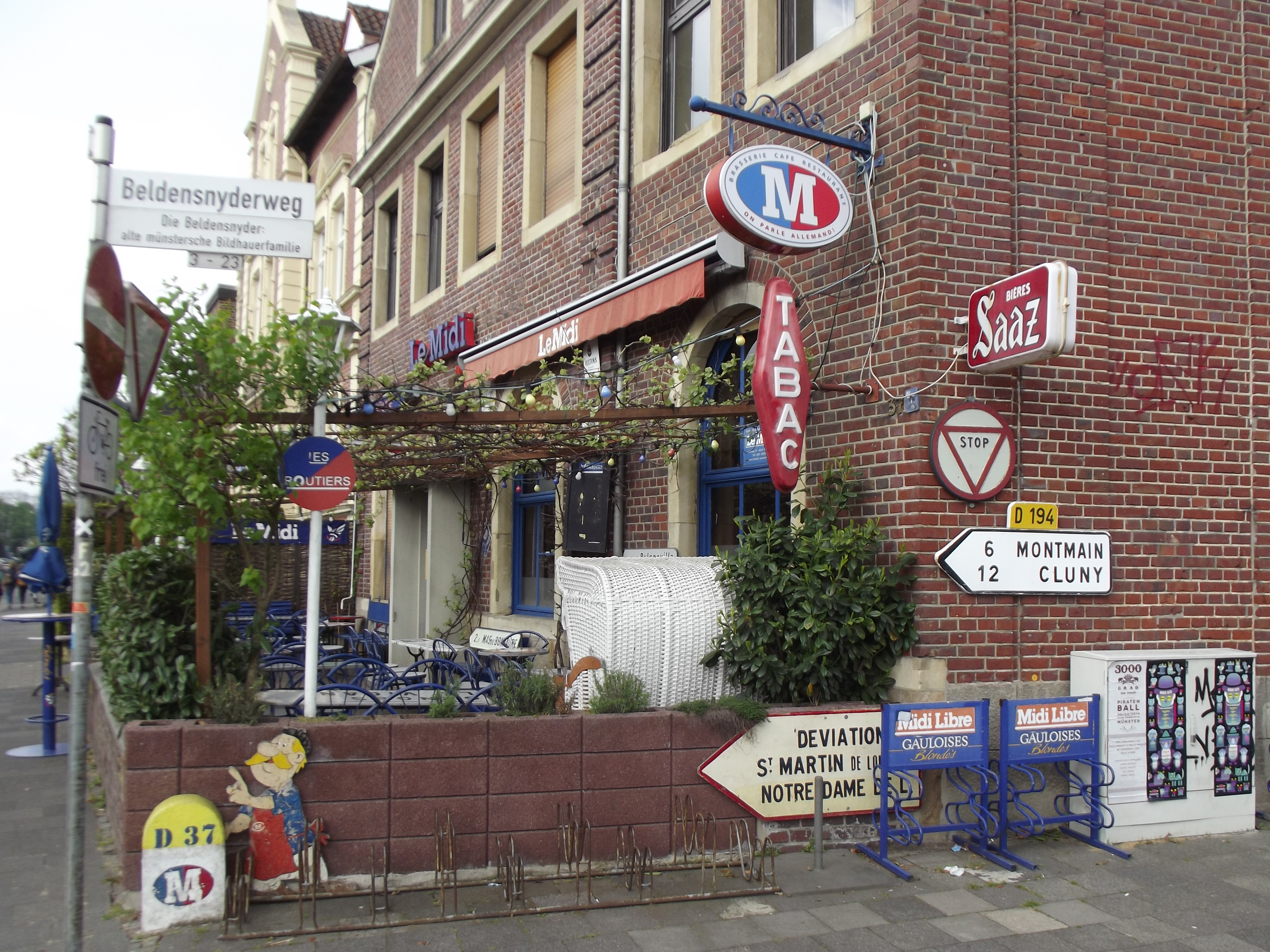
Francophile restaurant in Münster, Germany

A Francophile is a person who has a strong affinity or appreciation for the people, culture, language, history, or government of France. The term "Francophile" can be contrasted with Francophobe (or Gallophobe), someone who shows hatred or other forms of negative feelings towards all that is French.

A Francophile may enjoy French artists (such as Claude Monet, Pierre-Auguste Renoir, Edgar Degas, Paul Cézanne, and Henri Matisse); authors and poets (such as Victor Hugo, Alexandre Dumas, Voltaire, Honoré de Balzac, and George Sand), musicians (such as Daft Punk, Jean-Michel Jarre, Serge Gainsbourg, Édith Piaf, Johnny Hallyday, and Carla Bruni), filmmakers (such as Jean-Luc Godard, François Truffaut, Robert Bresson, and Jean-Pierre Melville), and cuisine (such as baguettes, croissants, frog legs, French cheeses, and French wine). Francophilia often arises in former French colonies, where the elite spoke French and adopted many French habits. In other European countries such as Romania and Russia, French culture has also long been popular among the upper class. Historically, Francophilia has been associated with supporters of Enlightenment philosophy during and after the French Revolution, where democratic uprisings challenged the autocratic regimes of Europe, as well as liberalism and opposition to absolute monarchy and authoritarian governments in general.

== Europe ==
=== Armenia ===
The Armenians of Cilicia welcomed the Frankish, or French, Crusaders of the Middle Ages as fellow Christians. There was much exchange, and the last dynasty to rule Armenian Cilicia, the Lusignans (who ruled Cyprus), was of French origin.

During the reign of Louis XIV, many Armenian manuscripts were taken into the National Library of France. Armenia and Armenian characters are featured in the works of Montesquieu, Voltaire, and Rousseau. The first instance of Armenian studies began with the creation of an Armenian department in the School of Oriental languages, at the initiative of Napoleon.

An important figure of Armenian Francophilia was that of Stepan Vosganian (1825–1901). Arguably the first Armenian "intellectual" and literary critic, Vosganian "represents the prototype of a long line of Armenian intellectuals nurtured in and identified with European, and particularly French, culture". Educated in Paris, he was a champion of liberalism and the positivist philosophy of Auguste Comte, and even took part in the French Revolution of 1848.

The French political classes were on the whole supportive of the Armenian national movement. The French–Armenian Agreement (1916) was a political and military accord to create the Armenian Legion in the French Army to fight on the Allied side of World War I, in return for promises of recognition of Armenian independence. The Armenian Legion engaged successfully in Anatolia and Palestine during World War I, particularly at the Battle of Arara and during the Franco-Turkish War.

=== Belgium ===
Francophilia or Rattachism is a revancist marginal political ideology in some parts of Belgium. Rattachism would mean the incorporation of French-speaking Belgium, Wallonia (and sometimes Brussels –more rarely of the entirety of Belgium) into Metropolitan France. This movement has existed in some form or another since the Belgian state itself came into existence in 1830. The Manifesto for Walloon culture of 1983, relaunched in 2003, and a series of discussions are the sole contemporary remnants.

=== Cyprus ===
The establishment of the Crusader Kingdom of Cyprus, in 1192, was the beginning of intense French influence on the island throughout the next three centuries. Touching almost every aspect of life, it would endure even after the end of Lusignan domination, and remains a strong component of Cypriot culture. In this wise the Republic of Cyprus became an associate member of the Francophonie in 2006.

=== Germany ===
In the 18th century, French was the language of German elites. A notable Francophile was King Frederick the Great of Prussia, or Frédéric as he preferred to call himself. Frederick spoke and wrote notably better French than he did German, and all of his books were written in French, a choice of language that was of considerable embarrassment to German nationalists in the 19th and 20th centuries when Frederick became the preeminent German national hero. One source noted: "Nor did Frederick have any time for German cultural chauvinism. As an ardent Francophile in matters literary and artistic, he took a low view of the German language, spoke it imperfectly himself, and once boasted that he had not read a book in German since his early youth. His preferences in music, art and architecture were overwhelmingly Italian and French". The French philosophe Voltaire when he visited Berlin to meet his admirer noted that everyone at the Prussian Court spoke the most exquisite French, and that German was only used when addressing servants and soldiers.

Another ardent German Francophile was King Ludwig II of Bavaria, a.k.a. "Mad King Ludwig". Ludwig felt a great deal of affinity for King Louis XIV of France, the "Sun King" and liked to call himself the "Moon King" to suggest a parallel between himself and his hero. Ludwig collected Louis XIV memorabilia, Linderhof Palace was modeled after the Palace of Trianon. An even more striking example of Ludwig's architectural Francophilia was the Palace of Herrenchiemsee, a copy of the Palace of Versailles.

=== Italy ===
The Norman conquest of southern Italy lasted from 999 to 1139.

- Joseph de Maistre, more well known in France than in Italy, his opposition to the French Revolution and Napoleonic Wars.
- Umberto Eco, a more contemporary example, admired the French for their anti-fascism and role in the de-Nazification of Germany and Austria.

=== Romania ===
Romania has a long and deeply entrenched tradition of Francophilia beginning after the Enlightenment and Revolutionary periods. One of the most famous Romanian Francophiles is Eugen Weber (1925–2007), a prodigious author and lecturer in Romania on French history. In his book "My France: politics, culture, myth", he writes: "Social relations, manners, attitudes that others had to learn from books, I lived in my early years. Romanian francophilia, Romanian francophony.... Many Romanians, in my day, dreamed of France; not many got there".

With the efforts to build Romania into a modern nation-state, with a national language and common national heritage, in the 19th century, the Romanian language was deliberately reoriented to its Latin heritage by a steady import of French neologisms suited to contemporary civilization and culture. "For ordinary Romanians, keen on the idea of the Latin roots of their language, 'Romance' meant 'French.'" An estimated 39% of Romanian vocabulary consists of borrowings from French, with an estimated 20% of "everyday" Romanian vocabulary.

Boia writes: "Once launched on the road of Westernization, the Romanian elite threw itself into the arms of France, the great Latin sister in the West. When we speak of the Western model, what is to be understood is first and foremost the French model, which comes far ahead of the other Western reference points." He quotes no less than the leading Romanian politician Dimitrie Drăghicescu, writing in 1907: "As the nations of Europe acquire their definitive borders and their social life becomes elaborated and crystallized within the precise limits of these borders, so their spiritual accomplishments will approach those of the French, and the immaterial substance of their souls will take on the luminous clarity, the smoothness and brilliance of the French mentality." Bucharest was rebuilt in the style of Paris in the 19th century, giving the city the nickname the "Paris of the East".

Other notable Romanian Francophiles include Georges Enesco, Constantin Brâncuși, Emil Cioran, Mircea Eliade, Eugène Ionesco and Nobel Peace Prize winner Elie Wiesel.

=== Russia ===
18th and 19th century Russian Francophilia (also known as "Gallomania") is familiar to many from Tolstoy's War and Peace and Anna Karenina, and his characters from the Russian aristocracy converse in French and give themselves French names. At the time, the language of diplomacy and higher education across much of Europe was French. Russia, recently "modernized", or "Westernized", by the rule of sovereigns from Peter the Great to Catherine the Great was no exception. The Russian elite, in the early 18th century, was educated in the French tradition and made a conscious effort to imitate the manners of France. Their descendants, a generation or two later, were no longer "imitating" French customs but grew up with them, and the strong impact of the French culture on Russian upper and even middle classes was evident, on a smaller scale than in the 18th century, until the Revolution of 1917.

=== Serbia ===
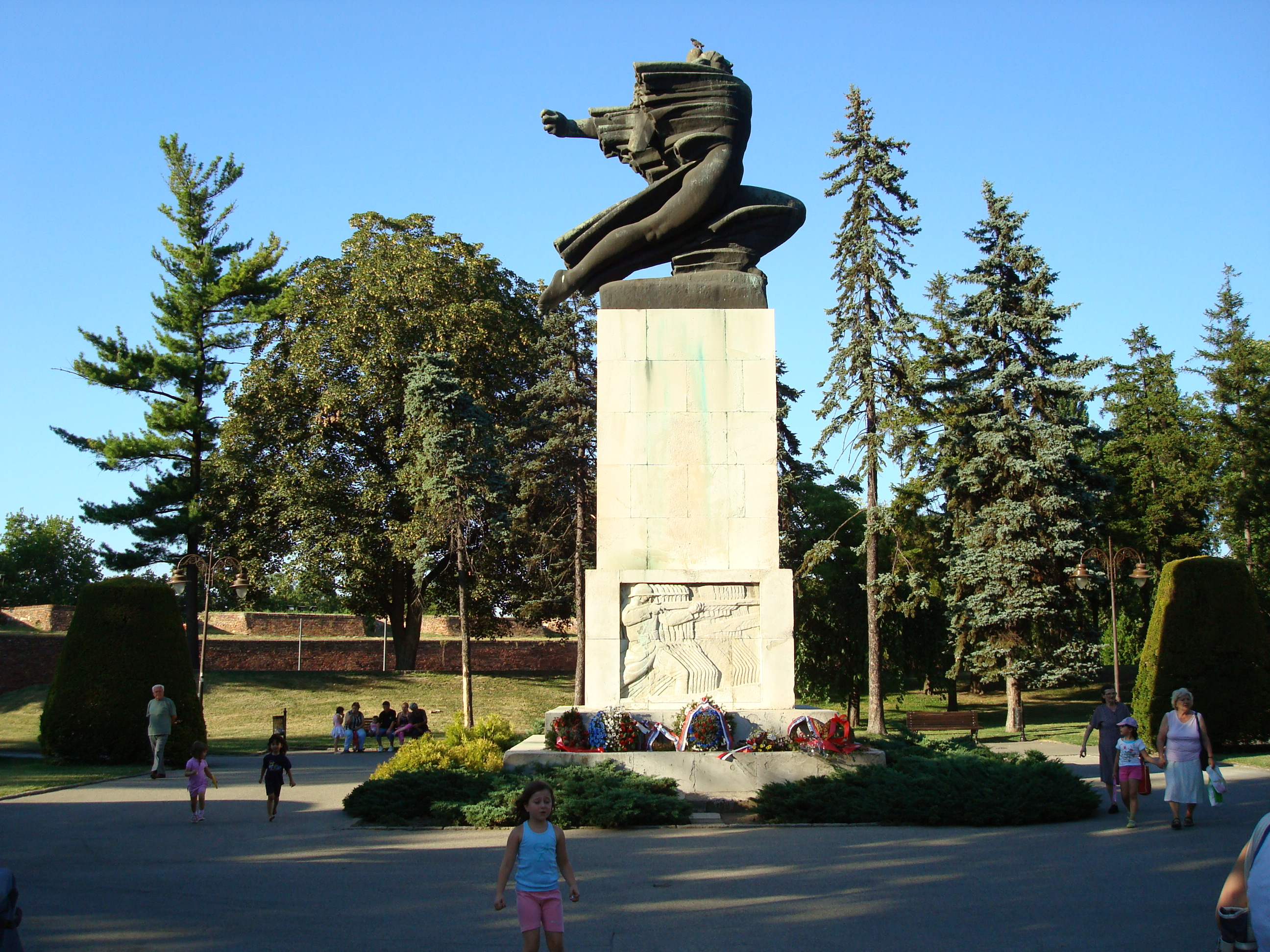
Monument of gratitude to France for help in World War I in center of Belgrade, Belgrade Fortress

The oldest documented possible contact between the two sides was the marriage of Stephen Uroš I of Serbia and Helen of Anjou in the 13th century.

The first important contacts of French and Serbs came only in the 19th century, when the first French travel writers wrote about their travels to Serbia. At that time Karađorđe Petrović, the leader of the Serbian Revolution, sent a letter to Napoleon expressing his admiration. On the other hand, in the French parliament, Victor Hugo asked France to assist in protecting Serbia and the Serbian population from Ottoman crimes. Diplomatic relations with France were established on 18 January 1879. Rapid development of bilateral relations done that people in Serbia in "mighty France" seen great new friend that will protect them from the Ottomans and Habsburgs. Relations between Serbia and France would go upwards until the First World War, when the "common struggle" against a common enemy would reach its peak. Before the war, France would win sympathy of local population by building railways by opening of French schools and a consulate and a Bank. Several Serbian kings were at universities in Paris as well as a large part of the future diplomats. Serbs have built a sense of Francophilia because the activities moved them away from the Ottoman and Habsburg Empires. For Serbs until 1914, French have become major allies what were even a threat for traditional inclination towards Russia. The great humanitarian and military assistance that France sent to Serbia during First World War, assistance in the evacuation of children, civilians and military at the end, and the support of French newspaper headlines even today are deeply ingrained in the collective consciousness of large number of Serbs.

Notable Serbian Francophiles include Ilija Garašanin and Sava Šumanović.

=== Spain ===
Between 1700 and the mid 20th century, francophilia played a major role in Spain both culturally and politically, comparable to the Atlanticism-Americanophilia that emerged in the second half of the 20th century. Francophilia was closely linked both to a cultural appreciation for French civilisation, but also to a desire to see France (or a certain interpretation of France) as a political model. Often rival groups in Spain, clashing over their desired political vision, would each turn to a different French example to legitimise their arguments.

Francophilia in Spain can be documented from at least the establishment of the Bourbon monarchy in 1700, when the political model associated with Louis XIV, that of the centralised Catholic absolute monarchy, was developed under his grandson king Philip V of Spain. During this period France served as a model for the monarchy's political and administrative reforms, as well as cultural and intellectual inspiration: the Real Academia for instance, was founded on the model of the Académie Française.

During the second half of the 18th century, Spanish supporters of the Enlightenment were inspired by ideas from France earning them the name "Afrancesado" (lit. "turned-French"). These sought to remake Spanish institutions, society and culture on humanist, rationalist and constitutionalist grounds, drawing strongly from the example of the Philosophes. The term later acquired a political dimension following the French Revolution and Napoleon Bonaparte's First French Empire, as reformers sought to implement their goals through two rival political models: a constitutional liberalism and Jacobinism inspired by the First French Republic, giving rise to the Constitution of Cádiz (1812) or a more Napoleonic Enlightenment monarchy during the French occupation of Iberia and the Constitution of Bayonne (1808). A third group, seeking to restore the absolute monarchy under Ferdinand VII, also looked to counterrevolutionary France for inspiration and encouragement, culminating in the military assistance of Louis XVIII and the Hundred Thousand Sons of Saint Louis.

In the mid 19th century, francophiles such as Javier de Burgos introduced liberal administrative reforms of the restored Spanish monarchy, modelled on the French administrative reforms of Napoleon and of the July Monarchy. During the 19th century, Spanish political movements were also strongly inspired by ideologies popular in France, such as republicanism, radicalism, socialism and anarchism on the left, as well as right-wing ideologies such as doctrinaire liberalism, Constitutional monarchism, bonapartism and Carlism-Legitimism.

During the Second Republic the democratic regime's governing class were in general strongly francophile and inspired by French republicanism, with the cultural and political attachment of figures such as Manuel Azaña, Alejandro Lerroux or Niceto Alcalà-Zamora making Spain a close diplomatic ally of the French Third Republic.

Growing disappointments in French democrats' support and a sense of French political and cultural decline, during the period of the Spanish Civil War, Second World War and Francoism, meant that francophilia in Spain generally declined. Consequently, from the mid-20th-century Spanish elites were generally more likely to express political Atlanticism and cultural Americanophilia than francophilia.

=== United Kingdom ===
==== Various ====
- Ralph Montagu, 1st Duke of Montagu was an "enthusiastic Francophile" who employed Huguenot craftsmen to create the French style Boughton House in Northamptonshire, where French was the preferred language spoken on the house grounds.
- The future war hero Herbert Kitchener was a Francophile who violated the Foreign Enlistment Act by serving as an ambulance driver in the French Army during the Franco-German War of 1870–71. In the late 19th and early 20th centuries, the resort city of Dieppe was regularly visited by "ardent Francophiles" like Arthur Symons, Ernest Dowson, Aubrey Beardsley and George Moore.
- Colonel T. E. Lawrence, a.k.a. "Lawrence of Arabia" is often depicted as a Francophobe, but the French historian Maurice Larès wrote that far from being a Francophobe as he is usually depicted in France, Lawrence was really a Francophile. Larès wrote: "But we should note that a man rarely devotes much of his time and effort to the study of a language and of the literature of a people he hates, unless this is in order to work for its destruction (Eichmann's behavior may be an instance of this), which was clearly not Lawrence's case. Had Lawrence really disliked the French, would he, even for financial reasons, have translated French novels into English? The quality of his translation of Le Gigantesque (The Forest Giant) reveals not only his conscientiousness as an artist but also a knowledge of French that can scarcely have derived from unfriendly feelings".

==== Government and military ====
- General Charles Vere Ferrers Townshend was a Francophile who liked to be addressed as ""Alphonse" and whose "Frenchified" manners often annoyed his colleagues. The diplomat Sir Robert "Van" Vansittart was a passionate Francophile who worked as a successful playwright in Paris before entering the Foreign Office. Vansittart always explained his Francophilia and Germanophobia under the grounds that as young man living in Europe the French were always kind to him while the Germans were cruel.
- The British Army officer and Conservative MP General Sir Edward Spears was a Francophile who as a fluent French-speaker served as a liaison officer between the French and British armies in both world wars. Spears was also an opponent of appeasement who founded the Anglo-French Parliamentary Association to bring together like-minded members of the French National Assembly and the British Parliament.
- Sir Winston Churchill was a Francophile who often expressed his admiration for France though the French historian François Kersaudy noted that Churchill's attempts to speak French usually left the French very confused as to what he was trying to say as Churchill's French was atrocious. Churchill often spoke of his love of the French, writing that Marshal Foch represented one aspect of France, "...the France, whose grace and culture, whose etiquette and ceremonial have bestowed its gifts around the world. There was the France of chivalry, the France of Versailles and above all, the France of Joan of Arc". Kersaudy called Churchill France's most "forceful and vocal champion" in interwar Britain, a time when many people saw the Treaty of Versailles as a vindictive, French-engineered treaty which was too harsh towards Germany, and accordingly Francophobia flourished among circles in Britain in favor of revising Versailles to remove some of the restrictions placed upon the Weimar Republic.
- It was frequently observed of Sir Austen Chamberlain, the Francophile Foreign Secretary 1924-29 that he "loved France like a woman, for her defects and her qualities", an aspect of his personality that Chamberlain was often attacked for.
- The Conservative MP Alfred Duff Cooper was in the words of the historian P.H Bell such a "devoted Francophile" that his time as British ambassador to France that he often tried the patience of the Foreign Office by going well beyond his instructions to maintain good relations with France by trying to create an Anglo-French alliance that would dominate post-war Europe.
- Bell also called Sir Anthony Eden a strong "Francophile" noted for his efforts as Foreign Secretary to reviving France as a great power during World War II. The novelist Nancy Mitford was a great Francophile who lived in Paris from 1946 until her death in 1973, and from 1943 onwards she served as the long-time mistress of Gaston Palewski, the right-hand man of General de Gaulle. The actress Charlotte Rampling who speaks French and often appears in French films calls herself a Francophile. The actress Kristin Scott Thomas is a noted Francophile who lives in Paris and often tried to interest her countrymen in French culture.

==== Writers ====
- The classicist Edward Gibbon was fluent in French as he was spent part of his youth in Lausanne, was greatly influenced by the French Enlightenment and was so influenced by French culture that has often been described as being "bi-cultural".
- David Hume was also fluent in French and was influenced by the French Enlightenment. He despised British culture and strongly preferred speaking French to English. He is loved in France, where he is known as "Le Bon Hume".
- The writer Charles Dickens was a Francophile who often vacationed in France and in a speech delivered in Paris in 1846 in French called the French "the first people in the universe".
- Another British Francophile was the writer Rudyard Kipling, who argued very strongly after World War I for an Anglo-French alliance to uphold the peace, calling Britain and France in 1920 the "twin fortresses of European civilization".
- The playwright Oscar Wilde was describe as an "ardent Francophile" who spent much of his time in Paris. One of the better known Francophiles during this period was King Edward VII who during his time as Prince of Wales lived for much of the time in France.
- The writer Raymond Mortimer was such a Francophile that he broke down in tears when he heard France had signed an armistice with Nazi Germany on 21 June 1940, saying it was if half of England had just fallen into the sea.
- The Francophile writer and historian Denis William Brogan wrote after hearing of the armistice of 1940 that he very much looked forward to the day when the "eternal France" which he loved would return. The Francophile novelist Charles Langbridge Morgan dedicated his 1940 novel The Voyage to two French friends, writing "France is an ideal necessary for civilization and will live again when tyranny is spent".
- The writer, diplomat and National Labour MP Harold Nicolson was a Francophile who when he visited France for the first time in five years in March 1945, he fell to kiss the earth upon landing in France. When a Frenchman asked the prostrate Nicolson "Monsieur a laissé tomber quelque-chose?" ("Sir, have you dropped something?"), Nicolson replied "Non, j'ai retrouvé quelque-chose" (No, I have recovered something").

== Asia ==
=== Cambodia ===
Cambodia was the French protectorate back in 1863, which signed a treaty between King Norodom of Cambodia and Marc Louis de Gonzague approved by Napoleon III, Emperor of the French will later become part of French Indochina in 1887. French is also a significant discipline in schools as the royal family and the Khmer people continued to learn French as a primary language. The French began widely introduced Cambodian education, initially being limited to the elite class before spreading to the masses nationwide as the economy grew significantly by the 1920s.

=== Iran ===
As with much of the Western world and the Middle East at the time, Francophilia was quite common in Iran in the 19th century, and even so more in the 20th century. In Iran, many key politicians and diplomats of the 20th century were French-educated or avid Francophiles. Among them Teymur Bakhtiar, the founder of the Iranian intelligence agency, SAVAK; Amir-Abbas Hoveida, Prime Minister of Iran from 1965 to 1977; Hassan Pakravan, a diplomat and intelligence figure; Nader Jahanbani, General under the last Shah; and Abdullah Entezam-Saltaneh, another famous diplomat to the West.

=== India ===
Maharaja Jagatjit Singh of Kapurthala (1872–1949) was India's most famous Francophile who was Captivated by French language, art, and culture, he styled his kingdom as the "Paris of Punjab". He spent decades traveling to France, employed French architects for his royal estate, and patronized top Parisian jewelers.

=== Japan ===
Prince Saionji Kinmochi, a genro (elder statesmen) was educated in France, where he received a law degree at the Sorbonne. In words of the Canadian historian Margaret Macmillan, Saionji "...loved the French, their culture and their liberal traditions. He even spoke French in his sleep. To the end of his life, he drank Vichy water and wore Houbigant cologne, which had to be imported specially for him". Prince Saionji was merely an extreme case of the Francophilia that characterized Meiji Japan. The Justice Minister, Etō Shimpei was an admirer of the French who modeled the legal and administrative systems together with the police force after that of France. A French lawyer Gustave Boissonade was recruited to draft the Japanese legal code, which is why the Japanese legal code today very closely resembles the Napoleonic Code. Another French lawyer, Prosper Gambet-Gross served as the special advisor to Kawaji Toshiyoshi who created a French-style police force for Japan. The Japanese educational system from 1872 onward was modeled after the French educational system and in the same year Japan was divided into prefectures as the French administrative system was considered by the Japanese to be the best in Europe. The Japanese received a French military mission in 1870 to train their army as the French Army was considered the best in the world. After France's defeat in the war of 1870–71, the Japanese sent the French military mission home, to be replaced by a German military mission.

The Japanese writer Kafū Nagai wrote after visiting France:

"No matter how much I wanted to sing Western songs, they were all very difficult. Had I, born in Japan, no choice but to sing Japanese songs? Was there a Japanese song that expressed my present sentiment -- a traveler who had immersed himself in love and the arts in France but was now going back to the extreme end of the Orient where only death would follow monotonous life? . . . I felt totally forsaken. I belonged to a nation that had no music to express swelling emotions and agonized feelings."

=== Lebanon ===
In Lebanon, Francophilia is very common among the Christian Maronites who have since the 19th century viewed the French as their "guardian angels", their special protectors and friends in their struggles against the Muslims. In 1860, the French intervened to put a stop to the massacres of the Maronites by the Muslims and the Druze which were being permitted by the Ottoman authorities, earning them the lasting thanks of the Maronites. Starting in the 19th century, much of the Maronite elite was educated at Jesuit schools in France, making the Maronites one of the most ardently Francophile groups in the Ottoman Empire. The Lebanese writer Charles Corm in a series of poems in French published after World War I portrayed the Lebanese as a "Phoenician" people whose Christianity and Francophilia made them part of the West and who had nothing to do either with the Arabs or Islam.

=== Ottoman Empire ===
Orientalism first arose in Early Modern France with Guillaume Postel and the French Embassy to the court of the Ottoman Sultan Suleiman the Magnificent. Later, when Mehmed IV sent the ambassador Müteferrika Süleyman Ağa to the court of Louis XIV in 1669, it caused a sensation that triggered the Turquerie fashion craze in France and then the rest of Western Europe, which lasted until well into the 19th century.

The Ottoman Empire granted France special privileges on account of the Franco-Ottoman alliance. French mercantilism was protected, French subjects were exempt from the taxes and tributes normally required of Christian residents of the Empire, no French subjects could be taken into Ottoman slavery and French subjects were granted full freedom of worship. Thus, France became the unofficial protector of all Catholics in the East.

In the late 18th and 19th centuries, French influence increased in Anatolia and the Middle East, and the French language and customs penetrated deep into the Ottoman learned classes and aristocracy; French was the preferred second language, rich Ottomans sent their children to school and universities in France and the Western "Enlightenment" was associated with French culture. Modern Turkish continues to have many French loanwords that were adopted in this period, and 5,350 Turkish words are of French origin, according to the Turkish Language Society, one eighth of a standard dictionary (See List of replaced loanwords in Turkish#Loanwords of French origin.). Francophilia still exists to a rather limited extent in modern Turkey. Vestiges of the 19th and early 20th century Francophilia include the famous Pera Palace hotel in Istanbul.

The French Revolution and its ideals of "Liberty, Equality, and Fraternity" inspired many secular and progressive movements in Ottoman Turkey, including the Young Turk movement that would go on to create the Republic of Turkey. Napoleon's breaking of the age-old Franco-Ottoman alliance by conquering Ottoman-controlled Egypt also had an effect. Muhammad Ali the Great, who became the Ottoman vali (governor) of Egypt in 1805 and ruled as a de facto independent ruler until his death in 1848 had been strongly impressed with the Napoleon's Armée d'Orient, and imported French veterans of the Napoleonic wars to train his army. Egypt was very much in the French sphere of influence politically, economically and culturally in the 19th century, and French was the preferred language of Egypt's elites right up to the 1952 revolution. At the court of the Khedive Isma'il Pasha of Egypt, better known as Isma'il the Magnificent the languages used were French and Turkish. Reflecting his Francophilia, the French-educated Isma'il emulated Baron Haussmann by tearing down much of Cairo to rebuild it in the style of Paris. Even today, the architecture of downtown Cairo closely resembles that of downtown Paris.

=== Vietnam ===
Ho Chi Minh learned to speak, write and to read French through his education in Saigon, French Indochina and his travels outside of Vietnam into the French merchant steamer, the Amiral de Latouche-Tréville to work as a kitchen helper. The ship departed on 5 June 1911 and arrived in Marseille, France on 5 July 1911, before continuing to Le Havre and Dunkirk, returning to Marseille in mid-September of that year. He began to show an interest in politics while living in France, he joined the Groupe des Patriotes Annamites (The Group of Vietnamese Patriots) in Paris where he became a member of the French Communist Party.

== Africa ==
=== Central African Republic ===
Colonel Jean-Bédel Bokassa of the Army of the Central African Republic seized power in 1965 and ruled until he was deposed by French troops in 1979. Bokassa was a great Francophile who maintained extremely close relations with France, often going elephant hunting with the French President Valéry Giscard d’Estaing. In 1977, Bokassa in imitation of his hero Napoleon crowned himself Emperor and renamed his nation the Central African Empire. Bokassa was also notorious as one of Africa's most brutal dictators, engaging in cannibalism, becoming so vicious that even the French could not stand supporting his regime anymore and thus the French Foreign Legion deposed the Emperor in 1979. Bokassa once nonchalantly told a French diplomat after his overthrow about the banquets he used to organize with the French style cooking that: "You never noticed it, but you ate human flesh."

=== Democratic Republic of the Congo (Zaire) ===
Patrice Lumumba was also a great francophile as well as Joseph-Désiré Mobutu because of its relations between Belgium and the Democratic Republic of the Congo which was ruled by Leopold II, King of the Belgians when he claimed the Congo Free State before it was reconstituted as a new territory, the Belgian Congo in 1908. On 30 June 1960, after 75 years of Belgian colonial rule in Central Africa, The Congo achieved its independence from Belgium, which later renamed as Zaire in 1971, before returning to its original name in 1997 with the First Congo War, nicknamed as (Africa's First World War). About half of Kinshasa residents feel solidarity towards Francophone countries, and French is seen as important for education and relations with the government. French is the sole official language of the Democratic Republic of the Congo.

=== Gabon ===
Omar Bongo, the long time dictator of Gabon from 1967 until his death in 2009 was described by The Economist in 2016 as "every inch the Francophile" who was very close to successive governments in Paris from the time he came to power until his death. In 2012, the country declared an intention to add English as a second official language, as Ali Bongo who succeeded his father as president does not share his father's Francophilia. However, it was later clarified that the country intended to introduce English as a first foreign language in schools, while keeping French as the general medium of instruction and the sole official language.

=== Ivory Coast (Côte d'Ivoire) ===
President Félix Houphouët-Boigny of the Côte d'Ivoire was described as a "staunch Francophile" who maintained very close links with France, and successfully insisted that the French name for his country be used instead of the Ivory Coast. It was Houphouet-Boigny who coined the term France-Afrique (later shortened to Françafrique) to describe the "special relationship" between France and its former African colonies, in which Francophone African nations were in the French political, cultural, military and economic sphere of influence, something which Houphouet-Boigny welcomed, though France's influence in Africa has been highly controversial given that most of the African regimes the French supported have been dictatorships.

=== Senegal ===
Léopold Sédar Senghor was the first African to become the member of the Académie Française in Paris after he wrote the memoirs of his native country of Senegal as its leader of Francophone Africa since it was colonized by France in 1677 that has located the oldest colonial city of Saint-Louis as a trading post. Dakar became the capital of French West Africa in 1902, with Louis Faidherbe and his black soldiers that once recruited by the French have created Senegalese Tirailleurs and transforming the African populations within its sphere into French citizens. Following the end of both World War I and World War II which led the liberation of Paris from the Nazi regime in August 1944, Senghor became the first President of Senegal on 6 September after the country gained independence from France on 4 April 1960, with Dakar as its capital remain. Senghor wrote the national anthem of Le Lion rouge, meaning (The Red Lion). French is the sole official language of Senegal while Wolof became the most spoken language in the country, the RTS were broadcast in French and even the money of CFA franc which was created by France as its former colony that is located in Dakar being the sole capital of Francophone Africa as Senegal and France have become both friendships with the currency of West African CFA franc and Central African CFA franc remained.

== North America ==
=== Canada ===
In Canada, the term has two distinct meanings, that of "appreciation of, or support for, France" and, more commonly, "appreciation of, or support for, French as an official language of Canada". With the expansion of French immersion programs in many schools following the passage of Official Languages Act of 1969 which elevated French to an equal official language of the national bureaucracy, many Anglophone Canadians have developed a greater appreciation for the French culture that is a part of the Canadian identity. Graduates of such programs (and others who speak French as an additional language) are called francophiles in Canada, as opposed to francophones which is the term typically reserved for native speakers or near-native fluent speakers of French.

=== Haiti ===
The Republic of Haiti was once the French colony of Saint-Domingue until a successful slave revolt drove the French out. Despite this history, the Haitian elite was traditionally very Francophile to the point that the Haitian writer Jean Price-Mars published a book in 1928 Ainsi Parla l'Oncle (So Spoke the Uncle) accusing the elite of bovarysme, of intentionally neglecting and ignoring traditional Haitian folk culture as it had too many West African elements and was not French enough for the elite. About 10% of Haiti's population speak French as their first language while the other 90% speak Kréyol (a mixture of French and various West African languages) that has often been mocked by the Francophile Haitian elite as a bastardized French. In Haiti, the question of whatever one speaks French or Kréyol is racially charged as the elite tended to be of Afro-European ancestry while the masses are black.

=== Mexico ===
General Antonio López de Santa Anna liked to call himself the "Napoleon of the West", and during his rule, the Mexican Army wore uniforms that closely resembled the uniforms of Napoleon's Grande Armée.

=== United States ===
In the United States, there is great interest in French culture, including French food, art, philosophy, politics, as well as the French lifestyle in general. Historically, French style, particularly that of Paris, has long been considered the height of sophistication by Americans of all social classes.

==== Historical ====
French support of the American Revolution was a significant factor in shaping American's feelings towards France. Prior to that, the French had been seen as rivals for control of North America until their defeat in the French and Indian War. With the elimination of France as a major colonial power in North America, the rivalry between American colonists and Parliament back home came into focus, and France's role switched to that of a potential ally.

The pro-French sentiment was probably strengthened by the overthrow of the French monarchy and the creation of a "brother-republic" in France. Notwithstanding the turmoil of the French Revolution and certain disputes between the two countries (such as the Quasi-War), generally good relations continued. During the Napoleonic era, the Louisiana Purchase, and the entry of the United States into the War of 1812, concurrent with the Napoleonic Wars, gave the two nations common interests and diplomatic relations blossomed.

Among the most famous early American Francophiles was Thomas Jefferson. Even during the excesses of the Reign of Terror, Jefferson refused to disavow the revolution because he was, as Jean Yarbrough wrote, "convinced that the fates of the two republics were indissolubly linked. To back away from France would be to undermine the cause of republicanism in America." Commenting on the continuing revolutions in the Netherlands and France, Jefferson predicted that "this ball of liberty, I believe most piously, is now so well in motion that it will roll round the globe, at least the enlightened part of it, for light & liberty go together. it is our glory that we first put it into motion." Jefferson would often sign his letters "Affectionately adieu" and commented late in life "France, freed from that monster, Bonaparte, must again become the most agreeable country on earth." The 1995 film Jefferson in Paris by James Ivory, recalls the connection. The "staunchly Francophile" Jefferson and, by extension, his adherents or "Jeffersonians", were characterized by his political enemies, the Federalists, as "decadent, ungodly and immoral Francophiles".

Benjamin Franklin, who spent seven years as the popular United States Ambassador to France was also a Francophile. Massachusetts Republican Senator Henry Cabot Lodge Jr. spent his first three grades in a Parisian school and majored in Romance Languages and Literatures at Harvard. Henry Cabot Lodge Sr., his grandfather, was also a Francophile and befriended Jean Jules Jusserand, the French Ambassador to the US.

Thomas Paine was another American Founding Father that was also a Francophile. He was broadly sympathetic to both the French Revolution and the Napoleonic Wars.

==== Various ====
Many Americans have studied at art schools in France, including the Beaux Arts academy in Paris, the premier institution of its kind in the country. The students and graduated alumni have been deeply influential on American style, particularly during the 19th and the early 20th centuries. Mark Twain was a Francophile to such an extent that he wrote the historical novel Personal Recollections of Joan of Arc (1896).

In the 1920s, many American intellectuals and writers, such as Hemingway and Fitzgerald, moved to Paris, a city that they linked to an idea of happiness. Other Americans, including several women, did so as well for various reasons. Josephine Baker is one of the most prominent of them all, as witnessed in her song "J'ai deux amours", in which she proclaimed her love for both USA and Paris. After WWII, another generation of Americans were attracted by Paris or southern France as well, including painters such as Jackson Pollock and Sam Francis or future celebrities such as Jackie Kennedy who used to live in Paris and are still beloved by French people. Some American politicians have also proclaimed their love for France, and even speak the language. Among them are John Kerry and Antony Blinken.

Francophile sentiment in the US was deeply influential on American public opinion and involvement in both World Wars. The Francophile filmmaker Preston Sturges always considered France his "second home" where he spent much of his childhood, was fluent in French and was greatly influenced by the films of his close friend René Clair. On the subject of cuisine, Julia Child is probably the most famous of many Francophile-American chefs and of many American graduates of French cooking-schools.

==== Actors ====
After WWII, Jean Seberg moved to Paris and eventually reached stardom while working there, married two Frenchmen and is buried there. Other notable francophile actors include Bradley Cooper, Joseph Gordon-Levitt, Matt Groening, Sam Simon, James L. Brooks, Trey Parker, Matt Stone, Seth MacFarlane, Bill Hicks, George Carlin, Bill Maher, Blake Lively, Natalie Portman, Molly Ringwald, Steven Gabrielle and Robert Crawford. The director and actor Woody Allen is a Francophile whose films often made references to French cinema, philosophy and novels. A recurring theme in Allen's films is the celebration of Paris as the ideal place for romantic love. Allen's 1982 film A Midsummer Night's Sex Comedy frequently pays homage to the work of Jean Renoir while Allen has described François Truffaut as his favorite director. The Francophile hero of Allen's 2011 film Midnight in Paris Gil Pender bears striking similarities with Allen, leading to reviewers to suggest that the character of Pender is a stand-in for the director-writer.

==== Business ====
The French-American Chamber of Commerce organization has worked to promote business ties between the two countries. A Dallas Morning News interview has described the Beaujolais Wine Festival, the largest such festival in the US, as a major event for those interested in French culture to mix.

== Oceania ==
=== Australia ===
Australia is tied to France through history: visit from Lapérouse and assistance during World War I. Australian also appreciate and look up to French culture and cuisine. Shops often try to make their name sound French and a trip to Paris is a common prize in games or often pictured in advertisements.

Bastille Day is celebrated in Sydney though a 4-days festival, drawing up to 500,000 people.

== See also ==
- Francophobia
- Organisation internationale de la Francophonie
- Alliance française
- List of French expressions in English
- Afrancesado, Spanish Francophiles of the 19th century
- Missão Artística Francesa, French culture mission in Brazil in the 19th and 20th centuries
- Culture of France
- List of French possessions and colonies
- Foreign relations of France
