= Are There Men on the Moon? =

1942 essay by Winston Churchill

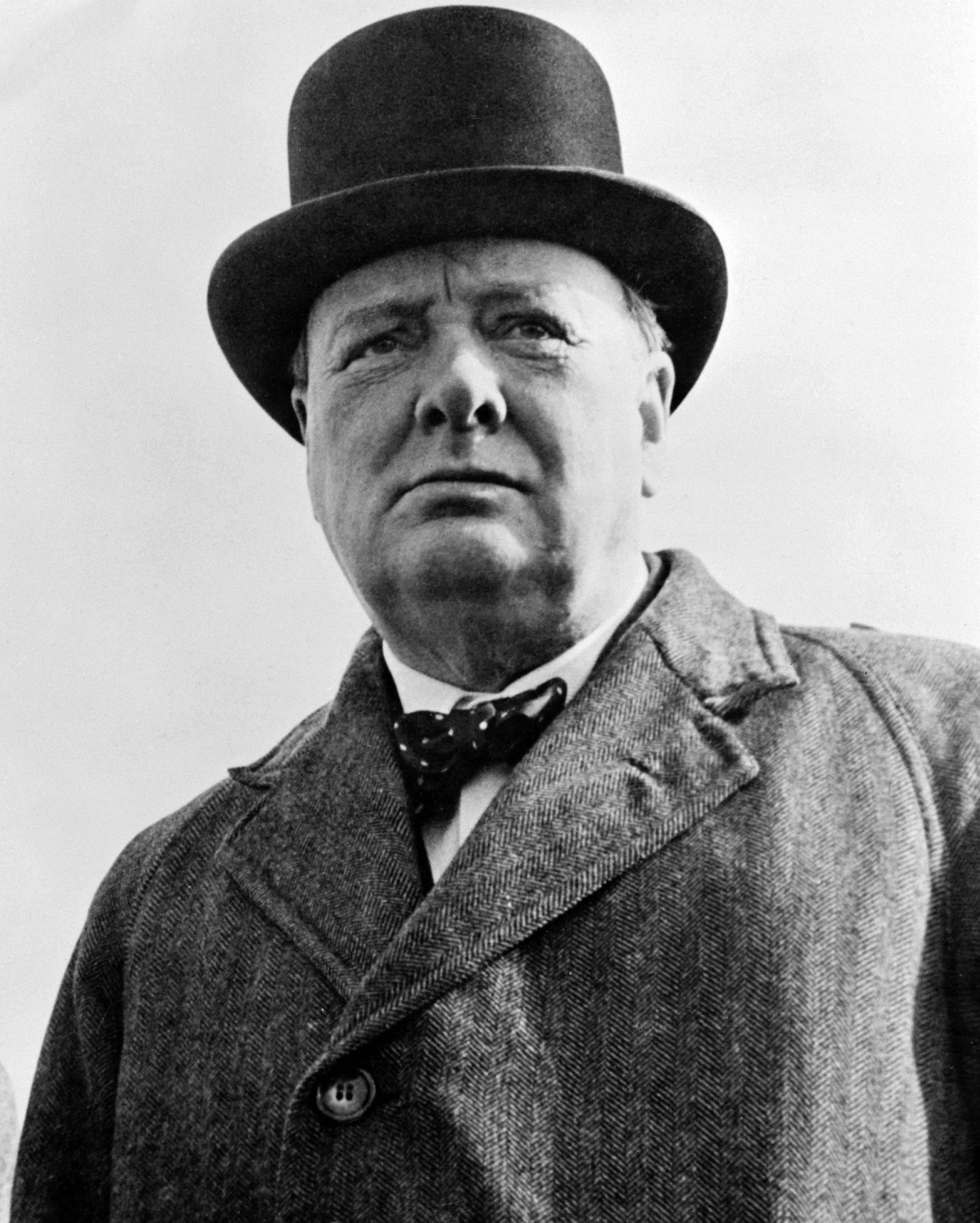
Winston Churchill in 1942

"Are There Men on the Moon?" is an 11-page essay by Winston Churchill on the possibility of extraterrestrial life. The essay was published in the Sunday Dispatch on 8 March 1942 and republished as part of The Collected Essays of Sir Winston Churchill in 1975.

Two unpublished versions of the essay are also known: A 1950s version held by the National Churchill Museum in Fulton, Missouri, United States, named "Are We Alone in the Universe?" and an earlier 1939 draft titled "Are We Alone in Space?", which is part of the collection of the Churchill Archives Centre at the University of Cambridge. The 1950s version of the essay gained media attention after an analysis of it by Mario Livio was published in Nature in 2017.

== Content and reception ==
=== Content ===
Churchill drafted the 11-page essay in 1939, just as Europe headed towards the Second World War. It starts with a question: "Does life exist elsewhere in the Universe?", which he answers by considering various aspects of the problem. In the first part, Churchill expounds on the nature of life. He writes that liquid water at comparatively moderate temperatures is necessary for life. He then turns to astronomical objects which could support such life. Due to their high temperatures, he rules out the stars as possibly habitable. Turning to the planets in the Solar System, he argues that the outer planets – Jupiter, Saturn, Uranus, Neptune and Pluto – should be too cold for life. But Mars and Venus could be at the right temperatures to support it, while it would be "unlikely" that life arose on Mercury. Turning to the Moon, he views it as an "arid desert" that, if at all, could only support the "lowest forms of life".

After the examination of the Solar System, he continues by thinking about planets orbiting other stars. Churchill thinks that stars outside the Solar System should also have planets. He then argues that some exoplanets should, in principle, be able to support life. He writes:

Once we admit that the other stars probably also have planets, at any rate a goodly proportion of them, it is more than likely that a large fraction of these will be the right size to keep on their surface water and, possibly, an atmosphere of some sort; and, furthermore, at the proper distance from their parent sun, to maintain a suitable temperature. Do they house living creatures, or even plants? The answer to this question may never be known.

After the reflection on exoplanets, Churchill turns to the exploration of the astronomical objects of the Solar System. Twenty-seven years before the first crewed Moon landing, he considers it "conceivable that one day, possibly even in the not very distant future, it may be possible to travel to the moon, or even to Venus or Mars", because it would be "rash to set limits to the progress of science". Still, the possibility of interstellar or intergalactic travel seems unlikely to Churchill due to the vast distances involved.

Churchill finishes his work with a clear indication that he believes in extraterrestrial life and extraterrestrial intelligence:

But I, for one, am not so immensely impressed by the success we are making of our civilisation here that I am prepared to think we are the only spot in this immense universe which contains living, thinking creatures, or that we are the highest type of mental and physical development which has ever appeared in the vast compass of space and time.

=== Reception ===
In his article in Nature, Mario Livio argues that "Churchill's reasoning mirrors many modern arguments in astrobiology." He sees Churchill's argument as resting on the Copernican principle, i.e. "the idea that, given the vastness of the Universe", it would be "hard to believe that humans on Earth represent something unique."

Writing for The Washington Post, Travis M. Andrews praises Churchill's prediction of the circumstellar habitable zone more than 60 years prior to writing. Furthermore, Andrews considers it remarkable "that politics and science" could go "hand in hand, each benefiting from the other" and argues that "in a world in which the two are treated by some as adversaries, this message might be more powerful than ever."

In The New York Times, Kimiko de Freytas-Tamura considers the point that Churchill deemed it "probable that extraterrestrial life existed somewhere in the universe" and saw the essay as an example that "science was not just a hobby for Churchill."

In his article in Smithsonian, Brian Handwerk pointed out the remarkable fact that Churchill drafted an essay on extraterrestrial life on the eve of the Second World War, but sees this as typical for Churchill, who had "scientific curiosity" and a "recurring need to write for money" due to his "family's lavish lifestyle".

== Discovery and versions ==
=== Discovery ===
The essay came into the public eye after a 2017 article by the astrophysicist Mario Livio in the comment section of Nature, which claimed that the essay had been "newly unearthed". In the article titled "Winston Churchill's Essay on Alien Life Found", Livio explains that Timothy Riley, the director of the National Churchill Museum, handed him the 1950s draft of the essay in 2016 for analysis. The 1950s version of the essay is introduced as having "never been published or subjected to scientific or academic scrutiny." In his in-depth analysis of the manuscript Livio argues that "Churchill reasoned like a scientist about the likelihood of extraterrestrials".

The article in Nature quickly gained considerable popular attention: It was discussed by BBC News, The New York Times, The Washington Post, The Guardian and NPR, among others.

Shortly after the article's publication in Nature, scepticism emerged concerning the essay's prior publication. Richard M. Langworth considered it likely that it was an unpublished variant of the version published on 8 March 1942 in Sunday Dispatch. Nature published a clarification on 6 April 2017 explaining that "part of that draft" had indeed been published as "Are There Men on the Moon?"

=== Versions of the essay ===
The essay was drafted in 1939 under the title "Are We Alone in Space?" The 1939 draft is kept by the Churchill Archives Centre in Cambridge under file reference CHAR 8/644. An article in Finest Hour speculates that it was at first intended for publication in the News of the World.

A reworked version of the essay was published on 8 March 1942 in the Sunday Dispatch and republished as part of The Collected Essays of Sir Winston Churchill in 1975. The text of this version has been made available online by The Churchill Project of Hillsdale College. According to an analysis by Finest Hour and a clarification by Nature, the published essay is missing the part concerning the nature of life and the short passage about Jupiter, which are both contained in the 1939 and 1950s drafts. The unpublished part of the essay concerning the nature of life has been made available online by Finest Hour.

The unpublished 1950s draft titled "Are We Alone in the Universe?" is held by the National Churchill Museum in Fulton, Missouri, United States. According to an analysis by Finest Hour it contains only "minor typographical differences" apart from the changed title. Mario Livio has argued that Churchill revised the 1950s draft in the villa of his literary agent, Emery Reves. The manuscript was handed to the National Churchill Museum by Wendy Russell Reves, the widow of Emery Reves, in the 1980s.
