= Mario Livio =

Romanian-born Israeli–American astrophysicist (born 1945)

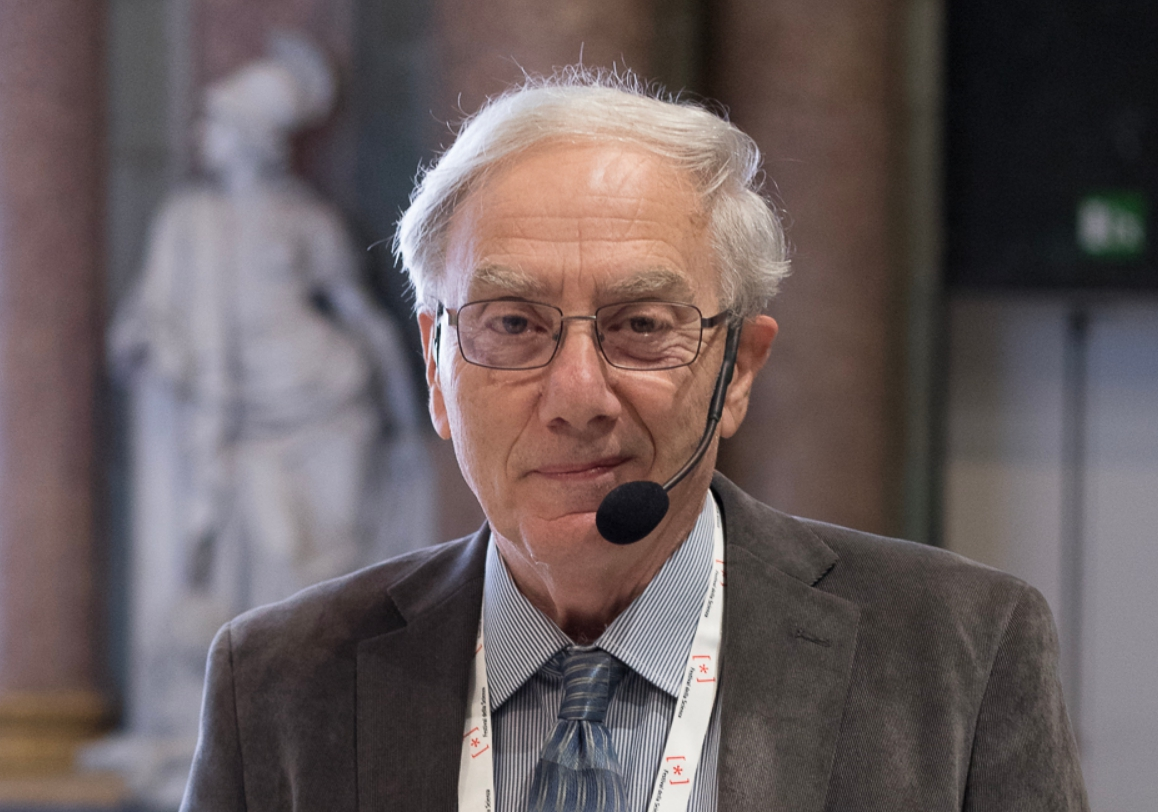
- Mario Livio at Festival della Scienza in Genova, 2017
- Born: June 19, 1945 (age 81); Bucharest, Kingdom of Romania
- Known for: Theory of Type Ia supernova Exoplanets; Accretion onto compact objects Emergence of life in the universe Galileo and the Science Deniers (2020); Why? What Makes Us Curious (2017); Brilliant Blunders (2013); Is God a Mathematician? (2009); The Equation That Couldn't be Solved (2005); The Golden Ratio: The Story of Phi, the World's Most Astonishing Number (2002)
- Awards: Fellow of the American Association for the Advancement of Science (2009), International Pythagoras Prize, for Best Expository Text in Mathematics (2005), Peano Prize (2003), Carnegie Centenary Professorship (2003)
- Scientific career
- Fields: Astrophysics
- Workplaces: Space Telescope Science Institute; Technion – Israel Institute of Technology

Mario Livio (born June 19, 1945) is an Israeli-American astrophysicist and an author of works that popularize science and mathematics. For 24 years (1991–2015) he was an astrophysicist at the Space Telescope Science Institute, which operates the Hubble Space Telescope.

He has published more than 400 scientific articles on topics including cosmology, supernova explosions, black holes, extrasolar planets, and the emergence of life in the universe.

His book on the irrational number phi, The Golden Ratio: The Story of Phi, the World's Most Astonishing Number (2002), won the Peano Prize and the International Pythagoras Prize for popular books on mathematics.

== Scientific career ==
Livio has focused much of his research on supernova explosions and their use in determining the rate of expansion of the universe. He has also studied so-called dark energy, black holes, and the formation of planetary systems around young stars.

He has contributed to hundreds of papers in peer-reviewed journals on astrophysics. Among his prominent contributions, he has authored and co-authored important papers on topics related to accretion onto compact objects (white dwarfs, neutron stars, and black holes).

In 1980, he published one of the first multi-dimensional numerical simulations of the collapse of a massive star and a supernova explosion.

He was one of the pioneers in the study of common envelope evolution of binary stars, and he applied the results to the shaping of planetary nebulae as well as to the progenitors of Type Ia supernovae.

Together with D. Eichler, T. Piran, and D. Schramm he published a seminal paper in which the authors predicted that merging neutron stars produce Gamma-Ray bursts, gravitational waves, and certain heavy elements. All of these predictions have later been confirmed.

In 2009, the American Association for the Advancement of Science (AAAS) Council elected him as a Fellow of the AAAS. Livio was cited for his "distinguished contributions to astrophysics through research on stars and galaxies and through communicating and interpreting science and mathematics to the public."

He is also cited in American Men and Women of Science.

Since 2010, Livio has mainly concentrated on the problem of the emergence of life in the universe. In this context, he co-authored (primarily with Rebecca G. Martin) a series of works related to life on Earth and life's potential emergence on extrasolar planets.

In 2015 he reviewed the scientific achievements of the Hubble Space Telescope in its first 25 years in operation.

Livio has been nominated three times by the USA Science and Engineering Festival as one of the "Nifty Fifty Speakers" to talk about his work and career to middle and high school students in 2010, 2011, and 2013.

Other honors include: Carnegie Centenary Professor in 2003, Danz Distinguished Lecturer in 2006, Resnick Distinguished Lecturer in 2006, Iben Distinguished Lecturer in 2008, and Terzian Distinguished Lecturer in 2011.

== Popular works ==
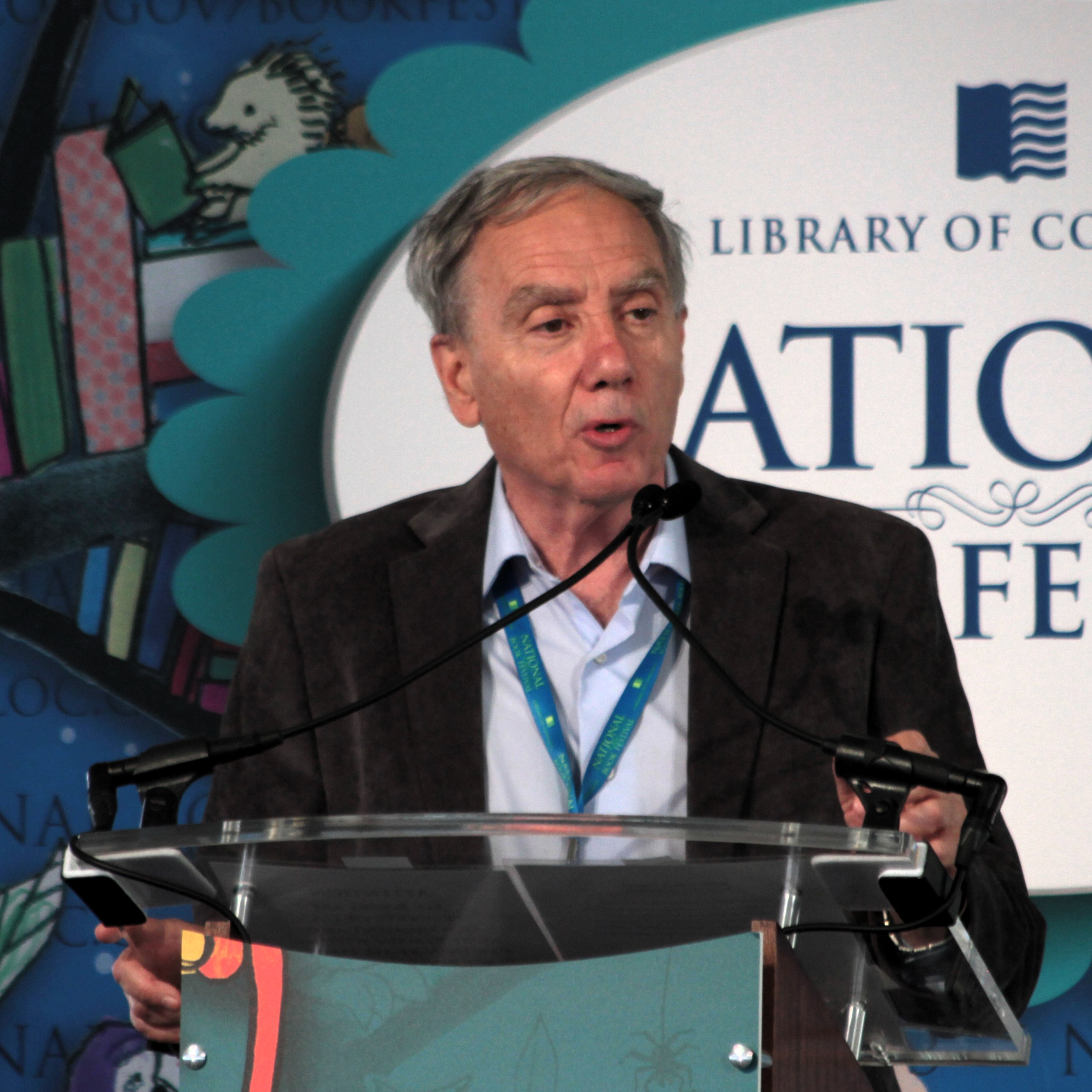
Mario Livio speaking on 22 September 2013 on the National Mall in Washington, DC during the 2013 National Book Festival

Livio has popularized astronomy and mathematics through books, lectures, magazine articles, and radio and television appearances. He has appeared on TV and radio outlets including PBS, NPR, and CBS to discuss scientific and mathematical subjects. Livio's first book of popular science was The Accelerating Universe (2000), which described the theory that the universe was expanding at a faster and faster rate. He explored the possible causes and the theoretical implications of continuing expansion, especially its implications for beliefs about the "beauty" of the scientific laws that govern the cosmos.

Livio's next book, The Golden Ratio: The Story of Phi (2002), concerned patterns in nature and art. He traced the influence of the golden ratio through many centuries of art, architecture, music, and even stock market theories.

The Equation That Couldn't Be Solved (2005) described how efforts to solve the quintic equation led to group theory and to the mathematics of symmetry. He emphasizes the crucial roles of Évariste Galois and Niels Henrik Abel in developing this branch of mathematics. The book contains biographical sketches of Galois, Abel, and several other mathematicians.

Is God A Mathematician? (2009) discusses the ability of mathematics to describe and predict accurately the physical world. Livio also attempts to answer a question with which mathematicians and philosophers have struggled for centuries: Is mathematics ultimately invented or discovered? The book was selected by the Washington Post as one of the best books of 2009.

Brilliant Blunders (2013) investigates serious mistakes by five notable figures in science: Charles Darwin, Lord Kelvin, Linus Pauling, Fred Hoyle, and Albert Einstein.

Why? What Makes Us Curious (2017) explores the nature of human curiosity, focusing on Leonardo da Vinci and Richard Feynman.

Galileo and the Science Deniers (2020) seeks to place Galileo Galilei's life and discoveries in modern scientific and social contexts, and draws a parallel between modern science denialism and the heresy charges against Galileo.

Is Earth Exceptional? (2024), written with Nobel laureate Jack Szostak, describes cutting-edge research on the origin of life on Earth and the astronomical search for extraterrestrial life.

== Personal life ==
Livio was born in Bucharest, Romania, and lived with his grandparents when his mother and father were forced to flee the country for political reasons. He had to leave Romania at age five with his grandparents. Following the launch of the Hubble Space Telescope he was offered a position at the Space Telescope Science Institute, and he moved to the U.S.

Livio and his wife Sofie, a microbiologist, have three children.

== Books ==
- The Accelerating Universe: Infinite Expansion, the Cosmological Constant, and the Beauty of the Cosmos. John Wiley. 2000. ISBN 0-471-39976-0; foreword by Allan Sandage.
- The Golden Ratio: The Story of Phi, the World's Most Astonishing Number. Broadway Books. 2002. ISBN 0-7679-0815-5.
- The Equation That Couldn't Be Solved: How Mathematical Genius Discovered the Language of Symmetry. Souvenir Press. 2006. ISBN 0-285-63743-6.
- Is God a Mathematician?. Simon & Schuster 2009. 6 January 2009. ISBN 978-0-7432-9405-8.
- Brilliant Blunders. Simon & Schuster. 2013. ISBN 9781439192375.
- Why? What Makes Us Curious. Simon & Schuster. 2017. ISBN 978-1476792095.
- Galileo and the Science Deniers. Simon and Schuster. 2020. ISBN 978-1501194733
- Is Earth Exceptional? Basic Books. 2024. ISBN 978-1541602960

== Lectures, a selection ==
- "Beauty in a Dark Universe". Robert Cormack Bequest workshop. University of St.Andrews. 13 May 2005. Archived from the original (Lecture) on 11 June 2007.
- "The World According to the Hubble Space Telescope" (Lecture). Events at the University of Illinois at Urbana-Champaign from Sept. 4 through 21. 2008.
- Venkataraman, Vivek (Nov 17, 2011). "Terzian lecturer presents Hubble telescope's top discoveries" (Review). Cornell Chronicle. Cornell University.
