= My Early Life =

1930 book by Winston Churchill

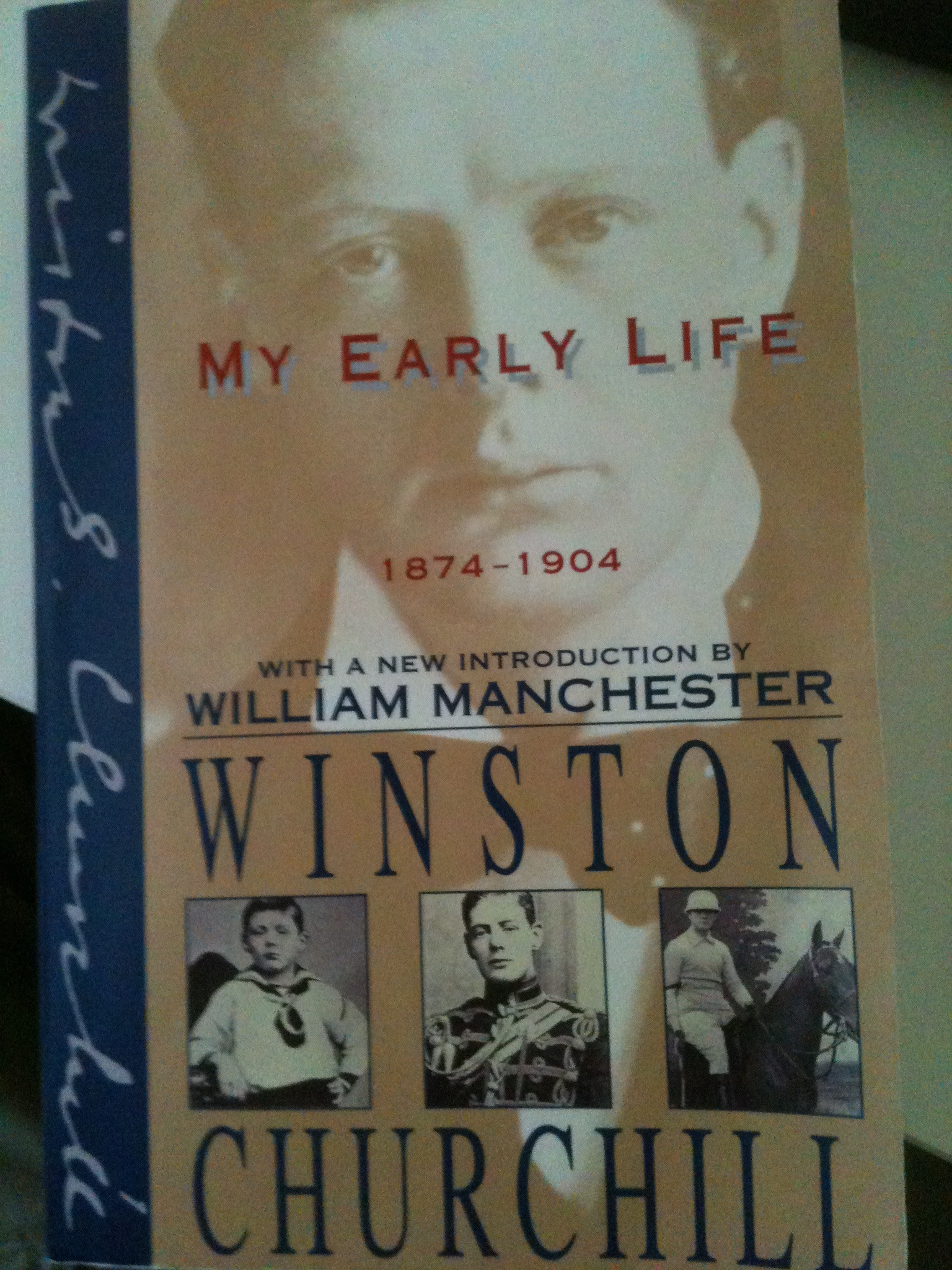
- Cover of a paperback edition of My Early Life, 2011
- Author: Winston Spencer Churchill
- Subject: Military campaigns
- Genre: Autobiography
- Publisher: T. Butterworth, London; C. Scribner's Sons, New York
- Publication date: 1930
- Publication place: England

My Early Life, also known as in the US as A Roving Commission: My Early Life, is a 1930 book by Winston Churchill. It is an autobiography from his birth in 1874 to around 1902. The book closes with mention of his marriage in 1908, stating that he lived happily ever after.

== Synopsis ==
The book begins by describing Churchill's childhood and schooldays, and provides context for the earlier published accounts of events in his early life. He describes his large collection of toy soldiers, his usually unsuccessful experiences in school, and how his family decided his path in life was to join the army as an officer.

Had he been a successful student by the standards of his youth, he would have learned Latin and Greek. Instead he describes how three terms under an excellent teacher made him proficient in writing and speaking English, two abilities on which he built his career. He was saddened by the early death of his father, not having the opportunity to have an adult relationship with him.

After Harrow School he attended the Royal Military College, Sandhurst, and became a cavalry officer. Travelling by ship to his first posting in India he dislocated his shoulder, an injury which limited his activity in sports and in battle, where his reliance on a pistol instead of his cavalry sword saved his life on at least one occasion. He was an avid polo player in the army. Eager for experiences, he was an observer in the Cuban War of Independence and took part in skirmishes in the North-West Frontier Province of India (an area now in Pakistan). As an officer in India with much spare time, especially in the heat of midday, he read widely in history, philosophy, and ethics.

He learned he could support himself financially as a reporter of the wars he witnessed, and by writing books about them. He was defeated in his first attempt to stand for election (the 1899 Oldham by-election) as a member of parliament. He became famous from his dramatic escape from being a prisoner of war in the Second Boer War, and he wrote newspaper accounts of later battles. He won the Oldham seat once he returned to England at age 25, at the 1900 UK general election.

== Background ==
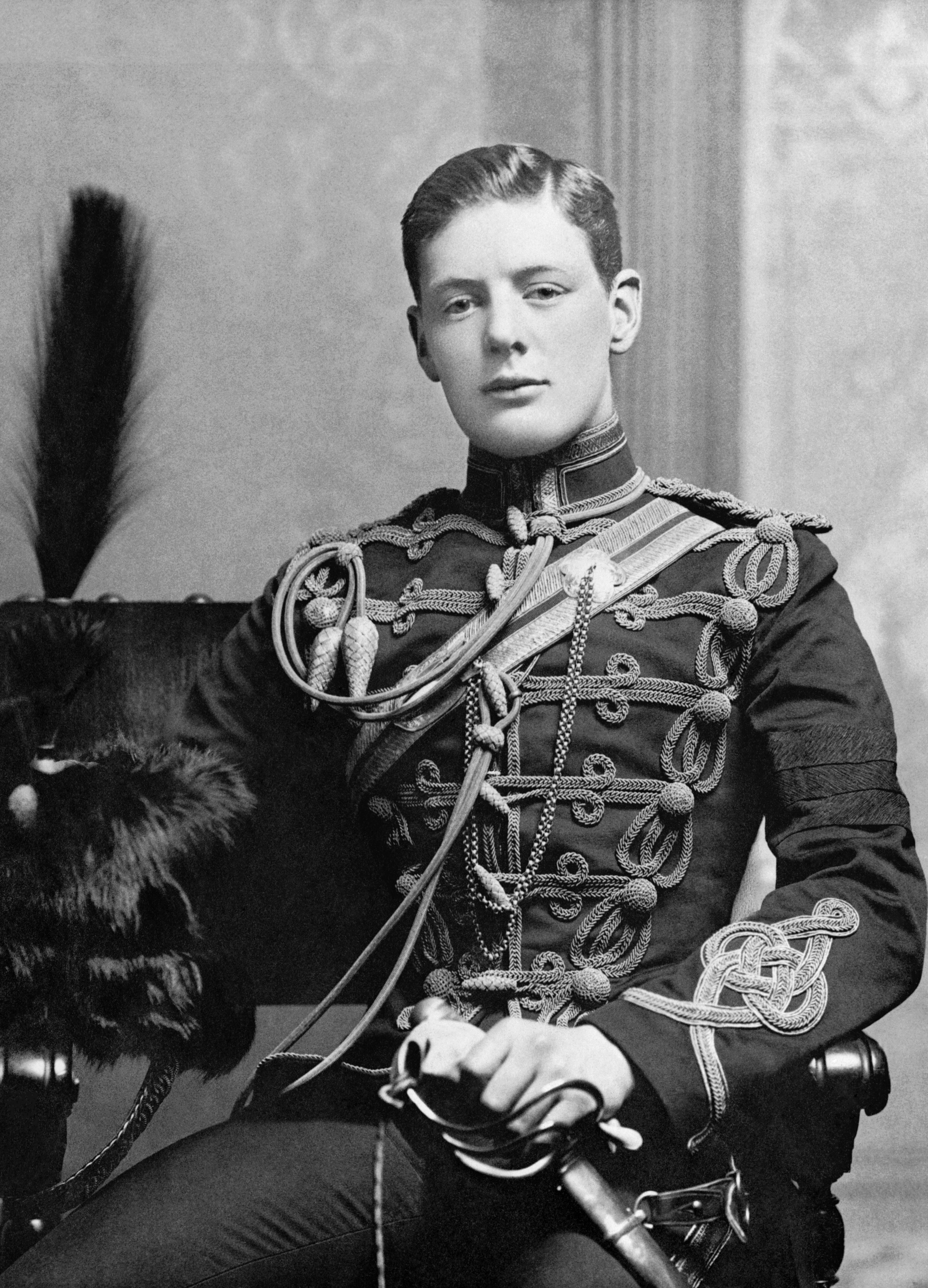
Churchill aged 21 as a subaltern in the 4th Hussars, 1895

The book includes descriptions of campaigns he had previously written about: The Story of the Malakand Field Force (1898) on the North-West frontier between Afghanistan and today's Pakistan (then part of British India), and The River War (1899) on the reconquest of Sudan the previous year. He gives significant coverage to his experiences in the Second Boer War of 1899–1902, which he had earlier described in London to Ladysmith via Pretoria (1900) and Ian Hamilton's March (1900), covering the periods before and after his capture. The introduction notes that Churchill endeavoured to write the book from his point of view at the time of the events, but it contains different commentaries on the events described in the other books, many of which were originally written as contemporary newspaper columns.

He wrote this autobiography in his mid 50s, after the Great War and before anyone knew there would be a Second World War. He notes that he has 'drawn a picture of a vanished age' in warfare and in the social structure of life in England (he also notes an observation by the French ambassador to Britain between 1900 and 1920, that during his time, a silent revolution had occurred, which totally replaced the ruling class of Britain). His characteristic optimism carries him through every experience of his life, allowing him to see events that at first seemed a misfortune as changing his path in life to one with a later success.

Most of My Early Life was written during the parliamentary recess in the summer of 1928. He wrote to Stanley Baldwin, "I have had a delightful month - building a cottage and dictating a book: 200 bricks and 2000 words per day." The book was published after the Conservative Party lost the 1929 election and consequently Churchill ceased to be a member of the government. He occupied himself, instead, writing a number of books, which together with public speaking was his chief source of income throughout his life.

The first English edition published by Thornton Butterworth in October 1930 sold 11,200 copies, and the American edition published by Charles Scribner's Sons sold 6,600. Scribner's titled the book by the name of its UK subtitle, A Roving Commission.

The book includes an observation made upon the death of his nanny. He wrote, "She had been my dearest and most intimate friend during the whole of the twenty years I had lived."

== Book ==
1. Childhood Life
2. Harrow
3. Examinations
4. Sandhurst
5. The Fourth Hussars
6. Cuba
7. Hounslow
8. India
9. Education at Bangalore
10. The Malakand Field Force (in today's Pakistan)
11. The Mamund Valley
12. The Tirah Expedition
13. A Difficulty with Kitchener
14. The Eve of Omdurman (in today's Sudan)
15. The Sensations of a Cavalry Charge
16. I Leave the Army
17. Oldham
18. With Buller to the Cape
19. The Armoured Train (in today's South Africa)
20. In Durance Vile
21. I Escape from the Boers-I
22. I Escape from the Boers-II
23. Back to the Army
24. Spion Kop
25. The Relief of Ladysmith
26. In the Orange Free State
27. Johannesburg and Pretoria
28. The Khaki Election
29. The House of Commons

== Reception ==
This book has been considered by some to be Churchill's best book and one of the outstanding works of the 20th century because it was deliberately written to be much shorter than his typical books, with a slight sense of irony and an intention to entertain. It contains a certain level of self-mockery alongside criticism of others he encountered. Unlike some other of his works, it did not seek to prove any particular point.

== Film ==
The 1972 film Young Winston was based on this book.

== Publication history ==
- Thornton Butterworth: London, 1930.
- Charles Scribner's sons: New York, 1930.
- 1990. ISBN 0-7493-0202-X (paperback)
- Eland: London, 2000. ISBN 978-0-907871-62-0
