= London to Ladysmith via Pretoria =

Book by Winston Churchill

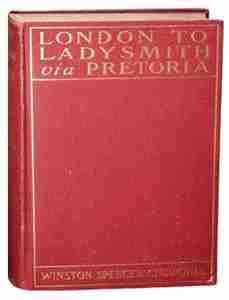
- A first edition copy of London to Ladysmith via Pretoria.
- Author: Winston Churchill
- Language: English
- Publication date: 1900

London to Ladysmith via Pretoria is a book written by Winston Churchill. It is a personal record of Churchill's impressions during the first five months of the Second Boer War. It includes an account of the Relief of Ladysmith, and also the story of Churchill's capture and dramatic escape from the Boers. The book was first published in 1900, and dedicated to the staff of the Natal Government railway.

== Background ==
In 1899 Winston Churchill, though he had left his Regiment, the 4th Hussars, in the previous March, was eager as ever to be within the sound of the guns and wasted no time in getting himself accredited to The Morning Post as war correspondent. He sailed from Southampton aboard the Dumottar Castle on 14 October and reached Cape Town on the 31st.

Churchill was captured while a military reporter. Churchill escaped from the prison camp and travelled almost 300 miles (480 km) to Portuguese Lourenço Marques in Delagoa Bay, with the assistance of an English mine manager. His escape made him a minor national hero for a time in Britain, though instead of returning home, he rejoined General Redvers Buller's army on its march to relieve the British at the Siege of Ladysmith and take Pretoria. This time, although continuing as a war correspondent, Churchill gained a commission in the South African Light Horse Regiment. He was one of the first British troops into Ladysmith and Pretoria. In fact, he and the Duke of Marlborough, his cousin, were able to get ahead of the rest of the troops in Pretoria, where they demanded and received the surrender of fifty-two Boer guards of the prison camp there.

Churchill later re-told the events described in articles in The Strand Magazine in 1923–24, and his autobiography My Early Life. He produced a second volume of his experiences continuing where this one ceased, Ian Hamilton's March.

== The events described ==
Churchill described his feelings when the armoured train he had been travelling with was ambushed by Boers:

"I have had, in the last four years, the advantage, if it be an advantage, of many strange and varied experiences, from which the student of realities might draw profit and instruction. But nothing was so thrilling as this: to wait and struggle among these clanging, rending iron boxes, with the repeated explosions of the shells and the artillery, the noise of the projectiles striking the cars, the hiss as they passed in the air, the grunting and puffing of the engine—poor, tortured thing, hammered by at least a dozen shells, any one of which, by penetrating the boiler, might have made an end of all—the expectation of destruction as a matter of course, the realisation of powerlessness, and the alternations of hope and despair—all this for seventy minutes by the clock with only four inches of twisted iron work to make the difference between danger, captivity, and shame on the one hand—safety, freedom, and triumph on the other."

He described his impressions of the Boer army when he first saw it, as a recently taken captive:

"What men they were, these Boers! I thought of them as I had seen them in the morning riding forward through the rain—thousands of independent riflemen, thinking for themselves, possessed of beautiful weapons, led with skill, living as they rode without commissariat or transport or ammunition column, moving like the wind, and supported by iron constitutions and a stern, hard Old Testament God."

And on the feeling of being a prisoner:

"I do not know how many men I saw, but certainly during this one march not less than 5,000. Of this great number two only offered insults to the gang of prisoners....But little and petty as it was it galled horribly. The soldiers felt the sting and scowled back; the officers looked straight before them. Yet it was a valuable lesson. Only a few days before I had read in the newspapers of how the Kaffirs had jeered at the Boer prisoners when they were marched into Pietermaritzburg, saying, 'Where are your passes?' It had seemed a very harmless joke then, but now I understood how a prisoner feels these things."

What he took with him on his successful escape and what he wished he had had:

"I had 75l. in my pocket and four slabs of chocolate, but the compass and the map which might have guided me, the opium tablets and meat lozenges which should have sustained me, were in my friend's pockets in the State Model Schools [i.e. the prison camp]".

On what a Boer said to Churchill about the heart of their dispute with the British:

"Educate a Kaffir! Ah, that's you English all over. No, no, old chappie. We educate 'em with a stick. Treat 'em with humanity and consideration—I like that. They were put here by the God Almighty to work for us. We'll stand no damned nonsense from them."

His feelings on seeing his younger brother wounded:

"It was his baptism of fire, and I have since wondered at the strange caprice which strikes down one man in his first skirmish and protects another time after time. But I suppose all pitchers will get broken in the end. Outwardly I sympathised with my brother in his misfortune, which he mourned bitterly, since it prevented him taking part in the impending battle, but secretly I confess myself well content that this young gentleman should be honourably out of harm's way for a month."

Churchill attempted to obtain his release arguing he was a civilian (he was most unhappy at the idea of remaining in prison for the duration of the war), as the Boers had released some civilian prisoners:

"Now, as it happened, I had confined myself strictly to the business of clearing the line, which was entrusted to me, and although I do not pretend that I considered the matter in its legal aspect at the time, the fact remains that I did not give a shot, nor was I armed when captured. I therefore claimed to be included in the same category as the civilian railway officials and men of the breakdown gang, whose declared duty it was to clear the line, pointing out that though my action might differ in degree from theirs, it was of precisely the same character, and that if they were regarded as non-combatants I had a right to be considered a non-combatant too."

What he did not describe in the book was that he had offered, if released, to take no more part in the campaign, nor give any information which might hurt the Boer cause. Just to hedge his bets, he also attempted to get himself re-classified as a military prisoner, as he had heard of a possible exchange of military prisoners. The Boers regarded him as a significant prisoner, because of his initiative in attempting to get the train moving and allowing the engine to escape, because of his reputation as a war correspondent, and because he was a minor member of the aristocracy whose father had been a member of the British government. Nonetheless, it transpired that the authorities were seriously considering the possibility of accepting his offer to withdraw from the war, which later gave rise to accusations he had broken his agreement when he resumed reporting after his escape.

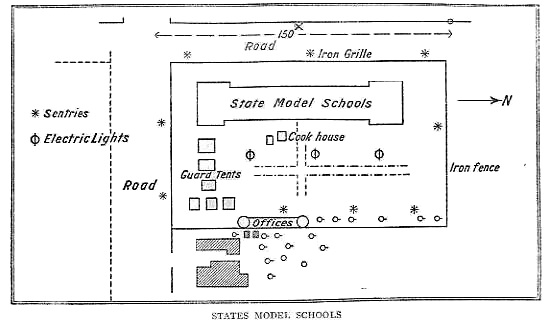
Churchill's diagram of the State Model School where he was held prisoner

With two others, Captain Haldane and Sergeant Brockie, Churchill devised a plan. The building where they were held was surrounded by a patrolled courtyard, and then a wall. The sentries moved about, and the conspirators determined that at a certain point the sentries would be briefly unable to see part of the wall, and a fit man would be able to climb it. On the first night they resolved to try to escape, the sentries changed their patrol pattern and escape was impossible. On the second an opportunity arose where two sentries stopped to talk to each other, and Churchill scaled the wall.

Brockie was killed at Ypres in 1915, but a simmering controversy broke out between Churchill and Haldane until his death in 1950 as to the exact events of that night. Haldane claimed that the party had again agreed to defer their escape, but that Churchill had then gone over the wall by himself. Churchill's account describes him waiting behind the wall for more than an hour for the others to join him, and then a discussion between them through the wall, where the others told him the sentry was suspicious and they could not escape. Haldane agreed a conversation took place, but not how Churchill had come to be on the other side of the wall while they had not.
