= Be ye men of valour =

1940 speech by Winston Churchill

Be Ye Men of Valour
The original radio broadcast from the BBC of the speech delivered by Winston Churchill during World War II.

Be Ye Men of Valour was a wartime speech made in a BBC broadcast on 19 May 1940 by Prime Minister of the United Kingdom Winston Churchill. It was his first speech to the nation as Prime Minister, and came nine days after his appointment, during the Battle of France in the second year of World War II. The speech concludes with a quotation from the Apocrypha, which supplies the phrase by which the speech became known:

Arm yourselves, and be ye men of valour, and be in readiness for the conflict; for it is better for us to perish in battle than to look upon the outrage of our nation and our altar. As the Will of God is in Heaven, even so let it be.

— Taken from 1 Maccabees 3:58–60

== In popular culture ==
- Samples of the speech are featured in Dutch symphonic metal band Within Temptation's song "Our Solemn Hour". The phrase "a solemn hour" is also included in the actual speech's beginning. An altered speech is used in their album Black Symphony where "the Germans" was replaced by "the enemy".
- Samples of the speech are also featured in Jay Electronica's song "Call of Duty" featuring Mobb Deep.
- Another sample of the speech can also be heard on the track "Unnatural Selection" on the metal opera album 01011001 from Arjen Anthony Lucassen's project Ayreon.

== See also ==
- Darkest Hour
