= Ian Hamilton's March =

Book by Winston Churchill

- Title page for Ian Hamilton's March (1900)
- Author: Winston Churchill
- Publisher: The Copp, Clark Company, Limited
- Publication date: 1900
- Pages: 113
- Preceded by: London to Ladysmith via Pretoria

Ian Hamilton's March is a book written by Winston Churchill. It is a description of his experiences accompanying the British army during the Second Boer War, continuing after the events described in London to Ladysmith via Pretoria.

== Writing ==
Churchill had officially resigned from the British army in order to pursue a political career, but on hearing of the outbreak of war in South Africa between the British colonies and the free Boer states of Transvaal and Orange Free State, immediately made arrangements to take part. He arranged to act as correspondent for The Morning Post, and by playing them off against the rival newspaper, the Daily Mail, obtained a salary of £250 per month. He also persuaded the Colonial Secretary Joseph Chamberlain to write him a letter of introduction to the High Commissioner for Southern Africa, Alfred Milner. He sailed from Southampton aboard the Dunottar Castle on 14 October 1899 and reached Cape Town on the 31st.

The book is an edited collection of reports originally published in a newspaper. Returning from the war, Churchill arranged to publish them as a collection and the book appeared in May 1900 published by Longmans and eventually sold 8,000 copies. In 1930 Churchill produced an autobiography, My Early Life, which also had several chapters devoted to his Boer War experiences.

== The events described ==
The book describes Lt-General Ian Hamilton's campaign from Bloemfontein to Pretoria. Hamilton travelled four hundred miles from Bloemfontein to Pretoria fighting ten major battles with Boer forces and fourteen minor ones.

== Editions ==
- Churchill, Winston (1900). Ian Hamilton's March. Toronto: The Copp, Clark Company, Limited. ISBN 9780665325762.
- Churchill, Winston (1900). Ian Hamilton's March. New York: Longmans, Green and Co.
