= François Kersaudy =

French historian

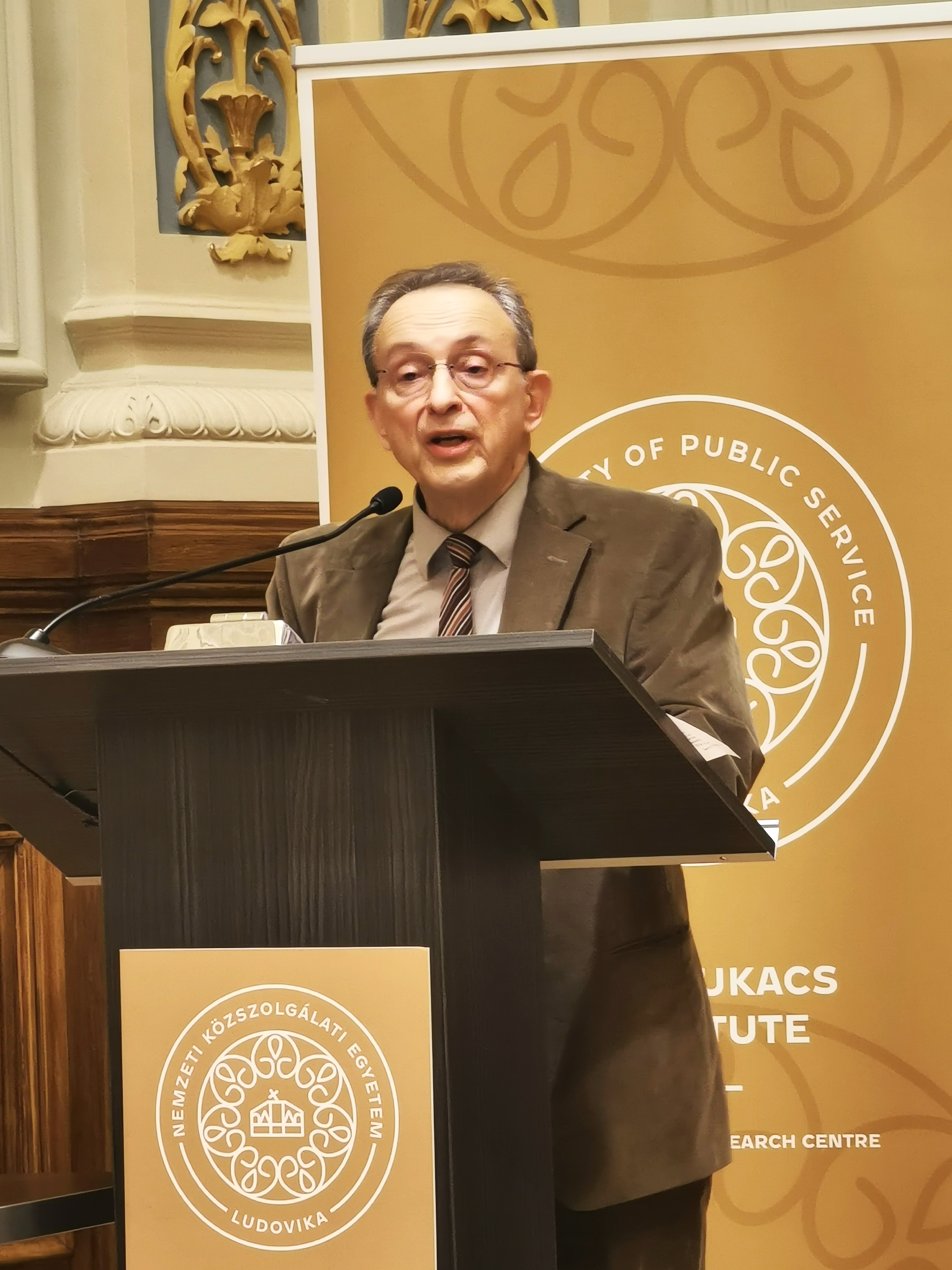
François Kersaudy in 2024

François Kersaudy OBE, FRSL, (born 1948) is a French historian and professor of English economic terminology at the University of Paris.

He is a specialist on the works of Winston Churchill. Among his books are Churchill and De Gaulle (Collins, 1981), Stratèges et Norvège 1940, les Jeux de la Guerre et du Hasard, which treated the Norwegian campaign in 1940, and Vi stoler på England (in Norwegian), published in 1993. His book Winston Churchill : Le pouvoir de l'imagination was awarded the Grand prix d’histoire de la Société des gens de lettres de France, and the Grand prix de la biographie politique in 2009. Author of French biographies of Mountbatten, Goering and MacArthur. Retranslated Churchill's wartime memoirs into French (Paris, Tallandier, 2009 and 2010)

His work published in English includes "Churchill and De Gaulle" and Norway, 1940.

Nine French Literary prizes, Yorkshire Post Best First Work award 1981, OBE.
