= Appeasement =

Diplomatic policy of concessions

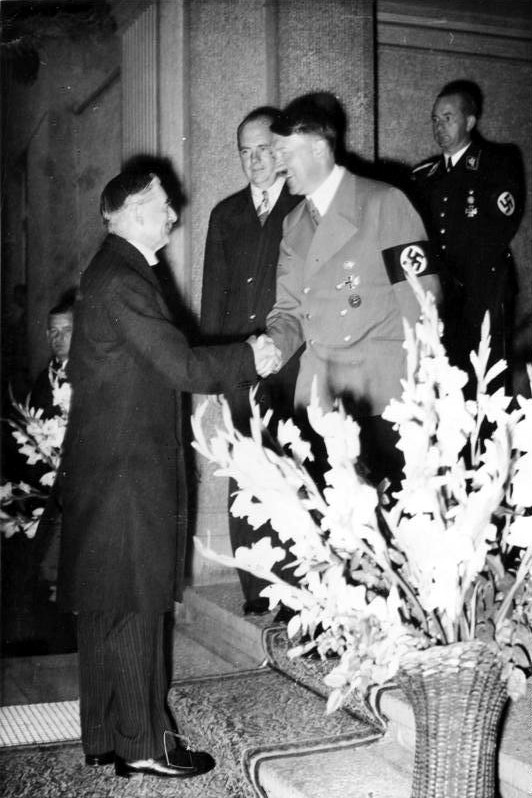
Adolf Hitler greets British Prime Minister Neville Chamberlain at the beginning of the Bad Godesberg meeting on 24 September 1938 in which Hitler demanded annexation of Czech border areas without delay, leading to the Godesberg Memorandum.

Appeasement, in an international context, is a diplomatic negotiation policy of making political, material, or territorial concessions to an aggressive power with intention to avoid conflict. The term is most often applied to the foreign policy between 1935 and 1939 of the British governments of Prime Ministers Ramsay MacDonald, Stanley Baldwin and most notably Neville Chamberlain towards Nazi Germany and Fascist Italy. Under British pressure, appeasement of Nazism and Fascism also played a role in French foreign policy of the period but was always much less popular there than in the United Kingdom.

In the early 1930s, appeasing concessions were widely seen as desirable because of the anti-war reaction to the trauma of World War I (1914–1918), second thoughts about the perceived vindictive treatment by some of Germany in the 1919 Treaty of Versailles, and a perception that fascism was a useful form of anti-communism. However, by the time of the Munich Agreement, which was concluded on 30 September 1938 between Germany, the United Kingdom, France, and Italy, the policy was opposed by the Labour Party and by a few Conservative dissenters such as future Prime Minister Winston Churchill, Secretary of State for War Duff Cooper, and future Prime Minister Anthony Eden. Appeasement was strongly supported by the British upper class, including royalty, big business (based in the City of London), the House of Lords, and media such as the BBC and The Times.

As alarm grew about the rise of fascism in Europe, Chamberlain resorted to attempts at news censorship to control public opinion. He confidently announced after Munich that he had secured "peace for our time".

Academics, politicians and diplomats have intensely debated the 1930s appeasement policies ever since they occurred. Historians' assessments have ranged from condemnation ("Lesson of Munich") for allowing Hitler's Germany to grow too strong to the judgment that Germany was so strong that it might well win a war and that postponing a showdown was in the best interests of the West.

== History ==
=== Failure of collective security ===
Appeasement policy, the policy of appeasing Hitler and Mussolini, operating jointly at that time, during 1937 and 1938 by continuous concessions granted in the hope of reaching a point of saturation when the dictators would be willing to accede to international collaboration.... It came to an end when Hitler seized Czechoslovakia on March 15, 1939, in defiance of his promises given at Munich, and Prime Minister Chamberlain, who had championed appeasement before, decided on a policy of resistance to further German aggression.

— Walter Theimer (ed.), The Penguin Political Dictionary, 1939

Chamberlain's policy of appeasement emerged from the failure of the League of Nations and the failure of collective security. The League of Nations was set up in the aftermath of World War I in the hope that international co-operation and collective resistance to aggression might prevent another war. Members of the League were entitled to the assistance of other members if they came under attack. The policy of collective security ran in parallel with measures conducted since the early 1920s like the Washington Naval Conference to achieve international disarmament that were stepped up with the largely symbolic Kellogg-Briand Pact of 1928 and the Disarmament Conference of 1932-34, and, if possible, was to be based on economic sanctions against an aggressor.

==== Invasion of Manchuria ====
In September 1931, the Empire of Japan, a member of the League of Nations, invaded Manchuria, in northeast China, by claiming that the regional population was not only Chinese but was multi-ethnic. The Republic of China appealed to the League of Nations and to the United States for assistance. The League of Nations Council asked the parties to withdraw to their original positions to permit a peaceful settlement. The United States reminded them of their duty under the Kellogg–Briand Pact to settle matters peacefully. Japan was undeterred and went on to occupy the whole of Manchuria. The League set up the Lytton Commission, a commission of inquiry that condemned Japan, and the League duly adopted the report in February 1933. In response, Japan resigned from the League and continued its advance into China, with neither the League nor the United States taking any action. However, the U.S. issued the Stimson Doctrine and refused to recognize Japan's conquest, which played a role in shifting U.S. policy to favour China over Japan during the late 1930s. Some historians, such as David Thomson, assert that the League's "inactivity and ineffectualness in the Far East lent every encouragement to European aggressors who planned similar acts of defiance". However it may be argued that the Lytton Commission’s report and the League’s ineffectual opposition to Japan, while not effective was also highly critical and therefore should not be taken as precedent for the appeasement of Germany in the later 1930s. World opinion never excused Japanese action in 1931-33 anywhere near the way it did German action in 1936-38.

==== Disarmament Conference ====
The Disarmament Conference had come at a time when the League was still a recognised arbiter of international disputes, was still looking at the Manchurian invasion, and as world leaders tried a myopic attempt to forestall war. The German delegates argued that either other states should cut their armaments to the Versailles‑imposed German levels or Germany should be allowed to attain military parity with its neighbours. Well before Hitler came to power, Weimar politicians had backed rearmament drives such as treaties of cooperation with the other international pariah, the Soviet Union. Hitler's walking out of the Conference signalled a new form of diplomacy that did not necessarily involve the League, which arguably had been bound to fail given the exclusion of isolationist America since 1920. From then on a new exploration of this diplomacy by Britain, who did not wish to cut off Germany entirely, was directed by National Government Foreign Secretary Samuel Hoare beginning with the 1934 Anglo-German Payments Agreement stabilised economic relations between Britain and Germany, guaranteeing German interest repayments on bonds arising from World War I reparations (which Hitler had stopped repaying in any case) and deepening British economic ties to Germany, particularly in the area of trade. Herbert von Dirksen, the German ambassador to Britain, in 1938 characterised the agreement, alongside the 1935 naval agreement, as carrying "the swaying structure of foreign relations [between the UK and Germany] even in critical periods".

==== Anglo-German Naval Agreement ====
The 1935 Anglo-German Naval Agreement had Britain permit Germany to begin rebuilding the German Navy, including its U-boats, despite Germany having repeatedly violated the Treaty of Versailles. Previously, since the Night of the Long Knives and the attempted coup against Engelbert Dollfuss in Austria, a pro-Austria (then an Italian satellite) Mussolini sought a common front with Britain and France against Hitler’s revisionism, the Stresa Front.

However a similar mutual defence pact with the Soviet Union by French foreign minister Louis Barthou, killed with King Alexander I of Yugoslavia in 1934, had been ratified anyway by the French in 1935, this driving Conservative opinion in Britain against the Stresa Front and in favour of direct dealing with Germany, hence the signing of the Agreement. This marked the first major step in a process originating from the failed Disarmament Conferences of 1933–34, which had begun optimistically, and led the British government and public opinion to seek a new European settlement treating Germany as an equal partner instead of under the Treaty of Versailles. The policy might have succeeded had German foreign policy been steered by moderate, cautious traditional right-wingers, as under Gustav Stresemann in the Weimar era, rather than by Hitler, a "va banque" gambler and megalomaniac.

According to A.J.P. Taylor, the British government was a key player with agency in the non-fascist camp’s diplomatic scene of the 1930s, as the United States was still overwhelmingly isolationist following the reaction to interventionism after 1917-18, and France was paralysed by a number of successive governments of the French Third Republic, often with razor-thin political margins that they did not wish to expend it on foreign policy and so chose or were obliged to follow Britain’s lead up until September 1939.

==== Abyssinia crisis ====
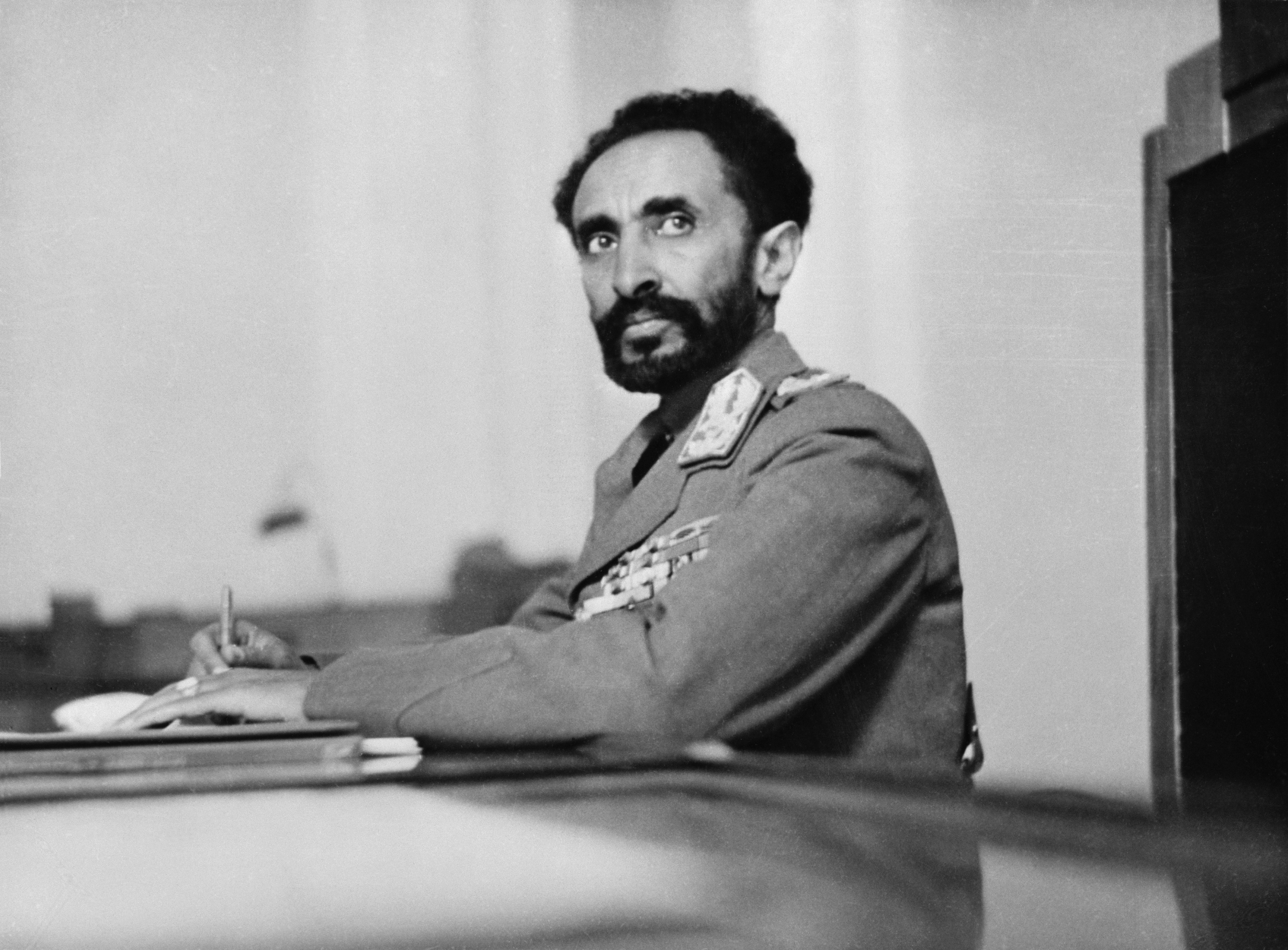
Emperor Haile Selassie of Ethiopia, c. 1942

Benito Mussolini had imperial ambitions in Abyssinia. Italy was already in possession of the neighbouring Eritrea and Somalia. In December 1934, there was a clash between Royal Italian Army and Imperial Ethiopian Army troops at Walwal, near the border between British and Italian Somaliland, in which Italian troops took possession of the disputed territory, and about 150 Abyssinians and 50 Italians were killed. Italy demanded apologies and compensation from Abyssinia, which appealed to the League, with Emperor Haile Selassie famously appealing in person to the assembly in Geneva. The League persuaded both sides to seek a settlement under the Italo-Ethiopian Treaty of 1928, but Italy continued troop movements, and Abyssinia appealed to the League again. In October 1935 Mussolini launched an attack on Abyssinia. The League declared Italy to be the aggressor and imposed sanctions, but coal and oil were not included, as it was feared sanctioning them would provoke war. Albania, Austria and Hungary refused to apply sanctions, and Germany and the United States were not in the League. Nevertheless, the Italian economy suffered. Britain considered closing off the Suez Canal, which would have stopped arms to Abyssinia, but thinking that would be too harsh a measure, failed to do so.

Earlier, in April 1935, Italy had joined Britain and France in protest against German rearmament. Britain was less hostile to Germany and set the pace in imposing sanctions and moved a naval fleet into the Mediterranean, but in November 1935, British Foreign Secretary Sir Samuel Hoare and French Prime Minister Pierre Laval had secret discussions in which they agreed to concede two thirds of Abyssinia to Italy. However, the press leaked the content of the discussions, and a public outcry forced Hoare and Laval to resign. This effectively cancelled out British attempts at resuming traditional non-League diplomatic tactics to keep Italy aboard the Stresa Front, as Britain had taken with the agreements with Germany, and, by the three principal remaining guarantors of the League operating so blatantly outside the League at the expense of another member, doomed its already tottering credibility in public eyes. After Abyssinia, international crises like the Czechoslovak crisis were barely even referred to the League, with traditional diplomacy having resumed its place in international affairs. Wilsonian idealism was now definitively dead, if it had ever truly been alive.

In May 1936, undeterred by sanctions, Italy captured Addis Ababa, the Abyssinian capital, and proclaimed Victor Emmanuel III as Emperor of Ethiopia. In July, the League abandoned sanctions. The episode, in which sanctions were incomplete and appeared to be easily given up, seriously discredited the concept of collective security, and more and more countries began to resume the course of traditional diplomacy (which had arguably never been completely suspended even during the League’s prime in the 1920s) that Britain had begun to pursue toward Germany since at least the Anglo-German Naval Agreement. The angry British public compelled Hoare to withdraw his offer, driving Mussolini toward Hitler's Germany, the sole state unwilling to denounce his invasion, and set the revival of traditional British foreign policy against a populace still favoring Wilsonian ideals. While British foreign policy struggled to readjust itself, the Rome-Berlin Axis was rapidly concluded with the new Italian pro-German foreign minister Galeazzo Ciano.

==== Remilitarisation of the Rhineland ====
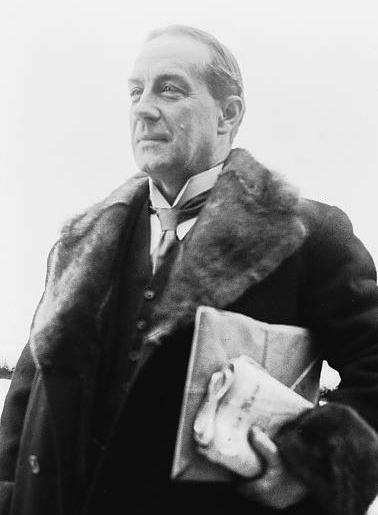
British Prime Minister Stanley Baldwin

Under the Versailles Settlement, the Rhineland was demilitarised. Germany accepted that arrangement under the Locarno Treaties of 1925. Hitler claimed that it prevented Germany’s self-defence, and, on 7 March 1936, sent the Wehrmacht into the Rhineland. He gambled on Britain not getting involved but was unsure of how France would react. The action was opposed by many of his advisers. His officers had orders to withdraw if they met French resistance. France consulted Britain and lodged protests with the League but took no action. Prime Minister Stanley Baldwin said that Britain lacked the forces (according to intelligence that turned out to have vastly overestimated the German forces’ strength) to back its guarantees to France and that in any case, public opinion would not allow so.

In Britain, it was thought that the Germans were merely walking into "their own backyard". Hugh Dalton, a Labour Party MP who usually advocated stiff resistance to Germany, said that neither the British people nor Labour would support military or economic sanctions. Therefore, unlike over Abyssinia, public opinion coincided with that of the government’s in not opposing the act of aggression for the sake of restoring Germany to an equitable position to create a lasting peace order by overturning that of Versailles.

In the Council of the League, only the Soviet Union proposed sanctions against Germany. Hitler, who was invited to negotiate, proposed a non-aggression pact with the Western powers. When asked for details, he did not reply. Hitler's occupation of the Rhineland had persuaded him that the international community would not resist him, and it put Germany in a powerful strategic position.

==== Spanish Civil War ====
It is not so much a case of taking actual steps immediately, as of pacifying the aroused feelings of the Leftist parties... by the very establishment of such a Committee.

— Otto Christian Archibald von Bismarck

Many historians argue that the British policy of non-intervention was a product of the Establishment's anti-communist stance. Scott Ramsay (2019) instead argues that Britain demonstrated "benevolent neutrality" and was simply hedging its bets by avoiding the favouring of one side or the other. The goal was that in a European war Britain would enjoy the "benevolent neutrality" of whichever side won in Spain.

It is clear that in either case, “Non-Intervention”, a French proposal gratefully endorsed by Britain on 2 August 1936 to avoid having to do anything, amounted to a prejudiced losing game for the legitimate government of Spain, the Spanish Republic, which was starved of arms, and isolated diplomatically due to Non-Intervention, forcing her to turn to the USSR for supply, thereby further isolating her.

For the Committee of European states that supervised its application were routinely told that the powers who were actively supplying the Nationalist faction (Germany and Italy) could not have broken a non-binding commitment, and they walked out at least once. The Republic was not even allowed to bring complaints as only members could do so. The German representative, Joachim von Ribbentrop later said:

It would have been better to call this the Intervention Committee, for the whole activity of its members consisted in explaining or concealing the participation of their countries in Spain.

— Joachim von Ribbentrop in his memoirs.

All the considerations of the Powers’ behaviour was based on their acting within the scope of extra-League resumption of traditional diplomacy that had become the norm since Abyssinia. A.J.P. Taylor cites the 1937 Nyon Conference as a rare instance of fascist backing down when confronted by Great Britain over unrestricted submarine warfare. Germany and Italy went as far as they dared, while George Orwell criticised the Republic for clinging to traditional diplomacy in regard to its policy in Spanish Morocco, a recruiting base of the Moroccan regulares of Franco, which the Republicans respected to avoid antagonising France over French Morocco.

=== Conduct of appeasement, 1937–1939 ===
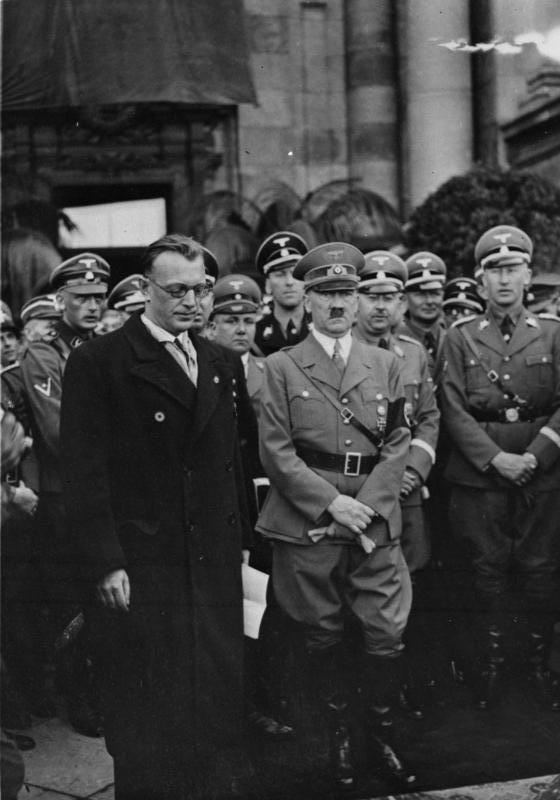
Seyss-Inquart and Hitler in Vienna, March 1938

In 1937, Stanley Baldwin resigned as Prime Minister. He was replaced by Neville Chamberlain, who pursued a policy of appeasement and rearmament. Chamberlain's reputation for appeasement rests in large measure on his negotiations with Hitler over Czechoslovakia in 1938. He had also, during the latter part of 1937, attempted to come to an understanding with Mussolini, moves opposed by his foreign secretary, Anthony Eden.

==== Anschluss ====
When the German Empire and Austria-Hungary were broken up in 1918, Austria was left as a rump state with the temporary adopted name Deutschösterreich ("German-Austria"), with the vast majority of Austrians wanting to join Germany. However, the victors' agreements of World War I (the Treaty of Versailles and the Treaty of Saint-Germain) strictly forbade union between Austria and Germany without League consent, as well as the name "German-Austria", which reverted to "Austria" after the emergence of the First Republic of Austria in September 1919. The constitutions of both the Weimar Republic and the First Republic of Austria, included the aim of unification, which was supported by democratic parties. However, the rise of Hitler dampened the enthusiasm of the Austrian government for such a plan. Hitler, an Austrian by birth, had been a pan-German from a very young age and had promoted a Pan-German vision of a Greater Germanic Reich from the beginning of his career in politics. He wrote in Mein Kampf (1924) that he would attempt a union of his birth country Austria with Germany by any means possible and by force if necessary. By early 1938, Hitler had consolidated his power in Germany and was ready to implement his long-held plan.

Austrian Chancellor Kurt Schuschnigg wished to pursue ties with Italy but turned to Czechoslovakia, Yugoslavia and Romania (the Little Entente). To that end, Hitler took violent exception. In January 1938, the Austrian Nazis attempted a putsch following which some were imprisoned. Hitler summoned Schuschnigg to Berchtesgaden in February and demanded, with the threat of military action, for him to release imprisoned Austrian Nazis and to allow them to participate in the government. Schuschnigg complied and appointed Arthur Seyss-Inquart, a pro-Nazi lawyer, as interior minister. To forestall Hitler and to preserve Austria's independence, Schuschnigg scheduled a plebiscite on the issue for 13 March. Hitler demanded for the plebiscite to be cancelled. The German Propaganda Ministry issued press reports that riots had broken out in Austria and that large parts of the Austrian population were calling for German troops to restore order. On 11 March, Hitler sent an ultimatum to Schuschnigg that demanded him to hand over all power to the Austrian Nazis or face an invasion. The British Ambassador in Berlin, Nevile Henderson, registered a protest with the German government against the use of coercion against Austria. Schuschnigg, realising that neither France nor the United Kingdom would actively support him, resigned in favour of Seyss-Inquart, who then appealed to German troops to restore order. On 12 March, the German Wehrmacht crossed the Austrian border. They met no resistance and were greeted by cheering Austrians. The invasion was the first major test of the Wehrmacht's machinery. Austria became the German province of Ostmark, with Seyss-Inquart as governor. A plebiscite was held on 10 April and officially recorded the support of 99.73% of the voters for the Anschluss.

Although the Allies had prohibited the union of Austria and Germany, their reaction to the Anschluss was mild. Even the strongest voices against annexation, particularly those of Fascist Italy, France and Britain (the "Stresa Front"), were not backed by force. In the British House of Commons, Chamberlain said, "The hard fact is that nothing could have arrested what has actually happened [in Austria] unless this country and other countries had been prepared to use force". The American reaction was similar. The muted international reaction to the events of 12 March 1938 amounted to a significant act of appeasement, allowing Hitler to continue his expansionary policies unchecked. The Anschluss paved the way for Munich in September 1938 because it indicated the likely non-response of Britain and France to future German aggression.

==== Munich Agreement ====
How horrible, fantastic, incredible it is that we should be digging trenches and trying on gas masks here because of a quarrel in a far-away country between people of whom we know nothing.

— Neville Chamberlain, 27 September 1938, 8 p.m. radio broadcast, on Czechoslovak refusal to accept Nazi demands to cede border areas to Germany.

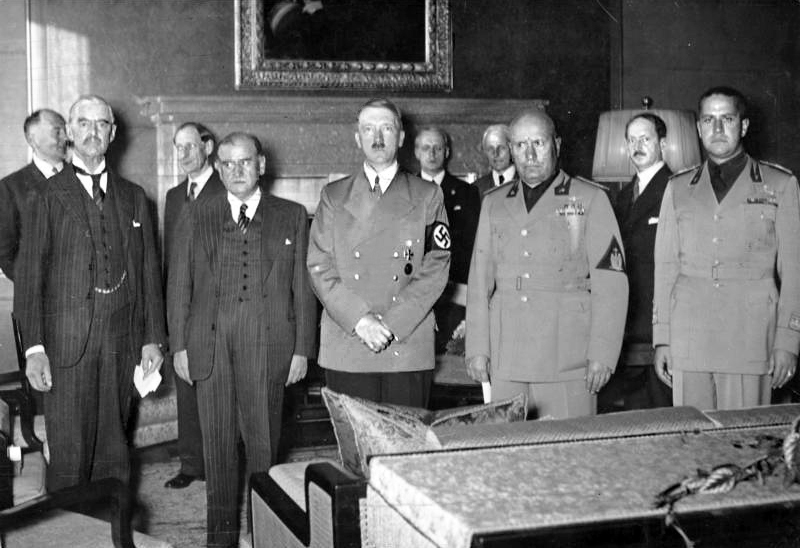
From left to right: Chamberlain, Daladier, Hitler, Mussolini and Ciano pictured before they sign the Munich Agreement, which gave the Czechoslovak border areas to Germany

Under the Versailles Settlement, Czechoslovakia was created with the territory of the Czech part more or less corresponding to the Czech Crown lands as they had existed within Austria-Hungary and earlier. The new country included Bohemia, Moravia, and Slovakia and had border areas with a majority-German population that was known as the Sudetenland and areas with significant numbers of other ethnic minorities (notably Hungarians, Poles and Ruthenians). In April 1938, the Sudeten German Party, led by Konrad Henlein, agitated for autonomy and then threatened, in Henlein's words, "direct action to bring the Sudeten Germans within the frontiers of the Reich". An international crisis ensued.

France and Britain advised Czechoslovak acceptance of Sudeten autonomy. The Czechoslovak government refused and ordered a partial mobilisation in expectation of German aggression. Lord Runciman was sent by Chamberlain to mediate in Prague and persuaded the Czechoslovak government to grant autonomy. Germany escalated the dispute, with the country's press carrying stories of alleged atrocities against Sudeten Germans, and Hitler ordering 750,000 troops to the Czechoslovak border. In August, Henlein broke off negotiations with the Czechoslovak authorities. At a Nazi party rally in Nuremberg on 12 September, Hitler made a speech attacking Czechoslovakia and there was an increase of violence by Sudeten Nazis against Czechoslovak and Jewish targets.

Chamberlain, faced with the prospect of a German invasion, flew to Berchtesgaden on 15 September to negotiate directly with Hitler, who now demanded that Chamberlain accept not Sudeten self-government within Czechoslovakia but the absorption of the Sudeten lands into Germany. Chamberlain became convinced that refusal would lead to war. The geography of Europe was such that Britain and France could forcibly prevent the German occupation of the Sudetenland only by the invasion of Germany. Chamberlain, therefore, returned to Britain and agreed to Hitler's demands. Britain and France told the Czechoslovak President Edvard Beneš to hand over to Germany all territory with a German majority. Hitler increased his aggression against Czechoslovakia and ordered the establishment of a Sudeten German paramilitary organisation, which proceeded to carry out terrorist attacks on Czechoslovak targets.

==== German annexation of Sudetenland ====
On 22 September, Chamberlain flew to Bad Godesberg for his second meeting with Hitler and said that he was willing to accept the cession of the Sudetenland to Germany. He was startled by the response of Hitler that the cession of the Sudetenland was not enough and that Czechoslovakia, which Hitler had described as a "fraudulent state", must be broken up completely. Later in the day, Hitler resiled by saying that he was willing to accept the cession of the Sudetenland by 1 October. On 24 September, Germany issued the Godesberg Memorandum, which demanded cession by 28 September or war. The Czechoslovak government rejected those demands, France ordered mobilisation and Britain mobilised the Royal Navy.

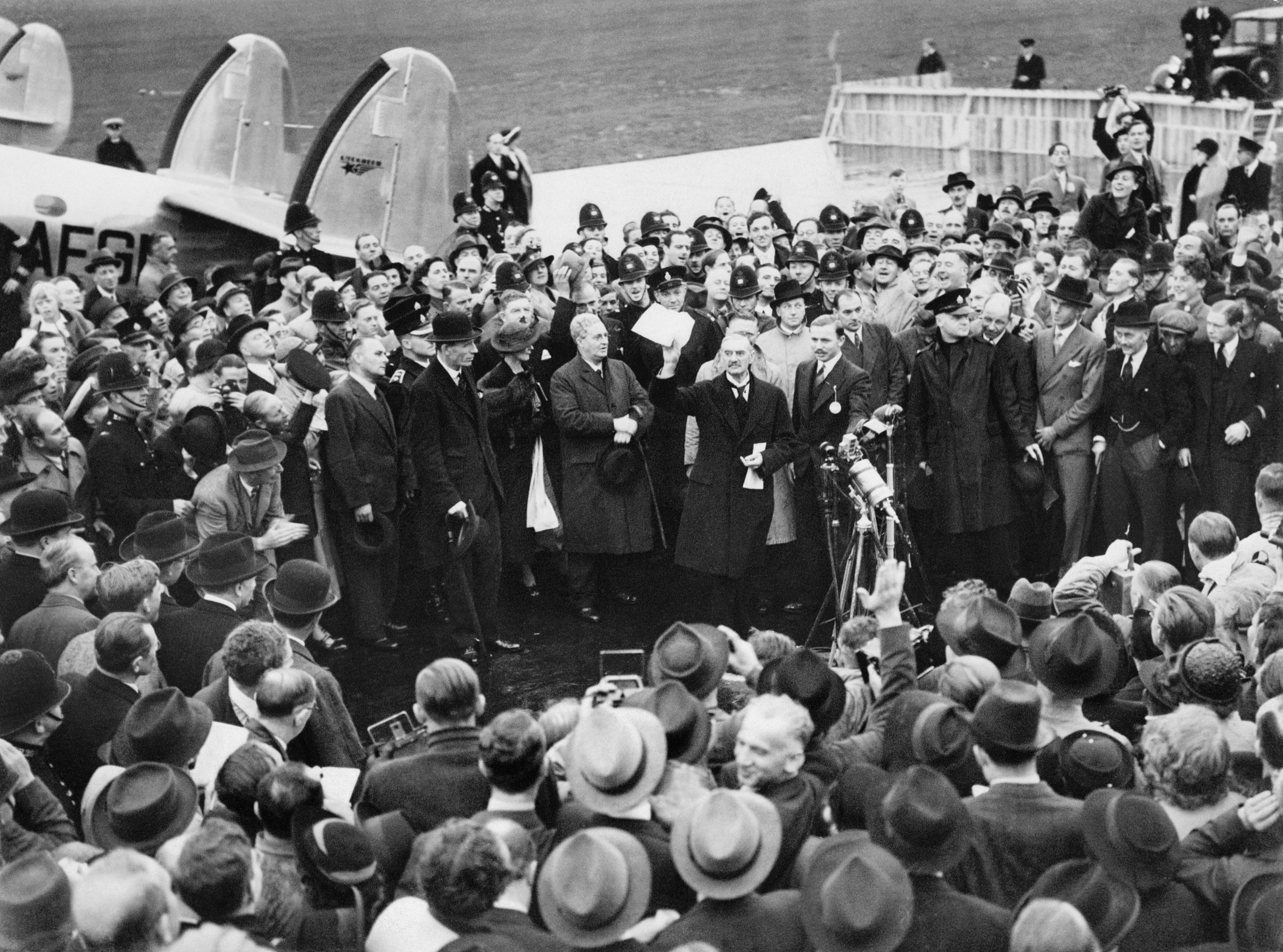
British Prime Minister Neville Chamberlain, landing at Heston Aerodrome on 30 September 1938 after his meeting with Hitler at Munich. In his hand, he holds the peace agreement between Britain and Germany.

On 26 September, Hitler made a speech at the Sportpalast in Berlin in which he claimed that the Sudetenland was "the last territorial demand I have to make in Europe", and he gave Czechoslovakia an ultimatum of 28 September at 2:00pm to cede the territory to Germany or to face war.

In the atmosphere of growing conflict, Mussolini persuaded Hitler to put the dispute to a four-power conference. On 29 September 1938, Hitler, Chamberlain, French Prime Minister Édouard Daladier and Mussolini met in Munich. Czechoslovakia was not to be a party to these talks, nor was the Soviet Union. The four powers agreed that Germany would complete its occupation of the Sudetenland but that an international commission would consider other disputed areas. Czechoslovakia was told that if it did not submit, it would stand alone. At Chamberlain's request, Hitler readily signed an agreement for peace between the United Kingdom and Germany. Chamberlain returned to Britain and promised "peace for our time". Before Munich, U.S. President Franklin D. Roosevelt had sent a telegram to Chamberlain that said, "Good man" and he later told the American ambassador in Rome, William Phillips, "I am not a bit upset over the final result".

==== First Vienna Award and German annexation of Bohemia and Moravia ====
As a result of the annexation of the Sudetenland, Czechoslovakia lost 800,000 citizens, much of its industry and its mountain defences in the west. The rest of Czechoslovakia was left weak and powerless to resist subsequent occupation. In the following months, Czechoslovakia was broken up and ceased to exist, as Germany occupied the Sudetenland; Hungary took part of Slovakia, including Carpathian Ruthenia; and Poland annexed Trans-Olza. On 15 March 1939, the German Wehrmacht moved into the remainder of Czechoslovakia, and from Prague Castle, Hitler proclaimed Bohemia and Moravia to be the Protectorate of Bohemia and Moravia, completing the German occupation of Czechoslovakia. Slovakia separated and became a German satellite state.

In March 1939, Chamberlain foresaw a possible disarmament conference between himself, Daladier, Hitler, Mussolini and Stalin. Home Secretary, Samuel Hoare, said, "These five men, working together in Europe and blessed in their efforts by the President of the United States of America, might make themselves eternal benefactors of the human race".

During the Munich negotiations, Britain and France pressured Czechoslovakia to cede territory to a hostile neighbor to maintain peace. Churchill likened the negotiations at Berchtesgarten, Bad Godesberg and Munich to a man demanding £1, then, when it is offered, demanding £2, then when it is refused settling for £1.17s.6d. British leaders committed to the Munich Agreement in spite of their awareness of Hitler's vulnerability at the time. In August 1938, General Ludwig Beck informed Lord Halifax that most of the German General Staff had readied a coup against the Fuhrer, to be triggered by "proof that England will fight if Czechoslovakia is attacked". When Chamberlain received the news, he dismissed it out of hand. In September, the British received assurance that the General Staff's offer to launch the coup still stood with key private sector police and army support, even though Beck had resigned his post. Chamberlain ultimately ceded to all of Hitler's demands at Munich because he believed Britain and Nazi Germany were "the two pillars of European peace and buttresses against communism".

Czechoslovakia had a modern well-prepared military, and Hitler, on entering Prague, conceded that a war would have cost Germany much blood but the decision by France and Britain not to defend Czechoslovakia in the event of war and the exclusion from the equation of the Soviet Union, which Chamberlain distrusted, meant that the outcome would have been uncertain. The event forms the main part of what became known as Munich betrayal (Czech: Mnichovská zrada) in Czechoslovakia and the rest of Eastern Europe, as the Czechoslovak view was that Britain and France had pressured it to cede territory to prevent a major war, which would involve Western Europe. The Western view is that the pressure was done to save Czechoslovakia from total annihilation.

==== German annexation of Lithuania's Klaipėda Region ====
Rumours had reached the Lithuanian government to the effect that Germany had specific plans to take over Klaipėda. On 12 March 1939, Foreign Minister Juozas Urbšys represented Lithuania at the coronation of Pope Pius XII in Rome. On Urbšys's return to Lithuania, he stopped in Berlin with the hope of clarifying the growing rumours. German Foreign Minister Joachim von Ribbentrop met Urbšys on 20 March, five days after the German occupation of Prague, while the Lithuanian Ambassador to Berlin, Kazys Škirpa, was left waiting in a separate room. The conversation lasted for about 40 minutes. Ribbentrop demanded the return of Klaipėda to Germany and threatened military action. Urbšys relayed the verbal ultimatum to the Lithuanian government. Because the ultimatum was never set down in writing and did not include a formal deadline, some historians downplay its importance and describe it as a "set of demands", rather than as an ultimatum. However, it was made clear that force would be used should Lithuania resist, and Lithuania was warned not to seek help from other nations. A clear deadline was not given, but Lithuania was told to make a speedy decision and that any clashes or German casualties would inevitably provoke a response from the German military.

Lithuania secretly informed the signatories of the Klaipėda Convention about those demands since technically, Lithuania could not transfer Klaipėda without the signatories' approvals. Italy and Japan supported Germany in the matter, and the United Kingdom and France expressed sympathy for Lithuania but chose not to offer any material assistance and followed a well-publicized policy of appeasement. The British treated the issue in the same way as the earlier Sudeten Crisis and made no plans to assist Lithuania or the other Baltic States if they were attacked by Germany. The Soviets supported Lithuania in principle but did not wish to disrupt their relations with Germany since they were contemplating the German-Soviet Pact. Without any material international support, Lithuania had no choice but to accept the ultimatum. Lithuanian diplomacy characterized the concession as a "necessary evil" to enable Lithuania to preserve its independence, and it maintained the hope that it was merely a temporary retreat.

==== Outbreak of World War II and Phoney War ====
By August 1939, Hitler was convinced that the democratic nations would never put up any effective opposition to him. He expressed his contempt for them in a speech that he delivered to his Commanders in Chief: "Our enemies have leaders who are below the average. No personalities. No masters, no men of action.... Our enemies are small fry. I saw them in Munich".

On 1 September 1939, German forces started their invasion of Poland. Britain and France joined the war against Germany but initially averted serious military involvement during the period known as the Phoney War. After the German invasion of Norway, opinion turned against Chamberlain's conduct of the war. He resigned after the Norway Debate in the British House of Commons, and on 10 May 1940 Winston Churchill became Prime Minister. In July, after the Fall of France, when Britain stood almost alone against Germany, Hitler offered peace. Some politicians both inside and outside the government were willing to consider the offer, but Churchill refused to do so. Chamberlain died on 9 November the same year. Churchill delivered a tribute to him in which he said, "Whatever else history may or may not say about these terrible, tremendous years, we can be sure that Neville Chamberlain acted with perfect sincerity according to his lights and strove to the utmost of his capacity and authority, which were powerful, to save the world from the awful, devastating struggle in which we are now engaged".

== Attitudes ==
As the policy of appeasement failed to prevent war, those who advocated it were quickly criticised. Appeasement came to be seen as something to be avoided by those with responsibility for the diplomacy of Britain or any other democratic country. By contrast, the few who stood out against appeasement were seen as "voices in the wilderness whose wise counsels were largely ignored, with almost catastrophic consequences for the nation in 1939–40". More recently, however, historians have questioned the accuracy of that simple distinction between appeasers and anti-appeasers. "Few appeasers were really prepared to seek peace at any price; few, if any, anti-appeasers were prepared for Britain to make a stand against aggression whatever the circumstances and wherever the location in which it occurred".

=== Avoiding mistakes of First World War ===
Chamberlain's policy in many respects continued the policies of MacDonald and Baldwin and was popular until the failure of the Munich Agreement to stop Hitler in Czechoslovakia. "Appeasement" had been a respectable term between 1919 and 1937 to signify the pursuit of peace. Many believed after the First World War that wars were started by mistake, in which case the League of Nations could prevent them; or that they were caused by large-scale armaments, in which case disarmament was the remedy; or that they were caused by national grievances, in which case the grievances should be redressed peacefully. Many thought the Versailles Treaty unjust, that German minorities should have self-determination, and that Germany should have equality in armaments.

=== Government views ===
Appeasement was accepted by most of those responsible for British foreign policy in the 1930s; by leading journalists and academics; and by members of the British royal family such as King Edward VIII and his successor, George VI. Anti-communism was sometimes acknowledged as a deciding factor, as mass labour unrest resurfaced in Britain, and news of Stalin's bloody purges disturbed the West. A common upper-class slogan was "better Hitlerism than Communism". In France, right-wingers were sometimes accused of believing "Better Hitler than Blum" in reference to the French Socialist Prime Minister Léon Blum at the time. Anti-communism was a motive of a close ally of Chamberlain, Lord Halifax, who said after he had visited Göring and met Hitler in Germany in 1936 and 1937: "Nationalism and Racialism is a powerful force but I can't feel that it's either unnatural or immoral! I cannot myself doubt that these fellows are genuine haters of Communism, etc.! And I daresay if we were in their position we might feel the same!"

Most Conservative MPs were also in favour, but Churchill said their supporters were divided. In 1936 he led a delegation of senior Conservatives to Baldwin, warning of the pace of German rearmament and of Britain falling behind. Baldwin rejected their sense of urgency and declared that he would not get Britain to war with anybody "for the League of Nations or anybody else" and that if there were to be any fighting in Europe, "I should like to see the Bolshies and Nazis doing it". Amongst Conservatives, Churchill was unusual in believing that Germany menaced freedom and democracy, that British rearmament should proceed more rapidly and that Germany should be resisted over Czechoslovakia. His criticism of Hitler began from the start of the decade, but Churchill was slow to attack fascism overall because of his own vitriolic opposition to communists, "international Jews" and socialism generally. Churchill's sustained warnings about fascism commenced only in 1938 after Francisco Franco, who was receiving aid from Italy and Germany during the Spanish Civil War, decimated the left in Spain.

The week before Munich, Churchill warned, "The partition of Czechoslovakia under pressure from the UK and France amounts to the complete surrender of the Western Democracies to the Nazi threat of force. Such a collapse will bring peace or security neither to the UK nor to France". He and a few other Conservatives who refused to vote for the Munich settlement were attacked by their local constituency parties. However, Churchill's subsequent leadership of Britain during the war and his role in creating the post-war consensus against appeasement have tended to obscure the fact that "his contemporary criticism of totalitarian regimes other than Hitler's Germany was at best muted". It was not until May 1938 that he began "consistently to withhold his support from the National Government's conduct of foreign policy in the division lobbies of the House of Commons". He seems "to have been convinced by the Sudeten German leader, Henlein, in the spring of 1938, that a satisfactory settlement could be reached if Britain managed to persuade the Czech government to make concessions to the German minority".

=== Military views ===
In Britain, the Royal Navy generally favoured appeasement although it was during the Abyssinia Crisis of 1937 that it was confident it could easily defeat the Royal Italian Navy in open warfare. However, it favoured appeasement because it did not want to commit a large fraction of its naval power to the Mediterranean Sea, which would weaken its positions against Germany and Japan. In 1938, the Royal Navy approved appeasement regarding Munich because it calculated that Britain then lacked the political and military resources to intervene and to maintain an imperial defence capability simultaneously.

Public opinion in Britain throughout the 1930s was frightened by the prospect of German terror bombing of British cities, which had started during the First World War. The media emphasised the dangers, and the general consensus was that defence was impossible and, as Prime Minister Stanley Baldwin had said in 1932, "The bomber will always get through". However, the Royal Air Force had two major weapons systems in the works: better interceptors (Hurricanes and Spitfires) and especially radar. They promised to counter the German bombing offensive but were not yet ready and so appeasement was necessary to cause a delay. Specifically, regarding the fighters, the RAF warned the government in October 1938 that the German Luftwaffe bombers would probably get through: "the situation... will be definitely unsatisfactory throughout the next twelve months".

In France, the Armée de l'Air intelligence section closely examined the strength of the Luftwaffe and decided the German pursuit planes and bombers were the best in the world and that the Germans were producing 1000 warplanes a month. It perceived decisive German air superiority and so it was pessimistic about its ability to defend Czechoslovakia in 1938. Guy La Chambre, the civilian air minister, optimistically informed the government that the air force could stop the Luftwaffe. However, General Joseph Vuillemin, air force chief of staff, warned that it was far inferior and consistently opposed war against Germany.

=== Opposition parties ===
The Labour Party opposed the fascist dictators on principle but until the late 1930s also opposed rearmament and had a significant pacifist wing. In 1935, its pacifist leader, George Lansbury, resigned after a party resolution in favour of sanctions against Italy, which he opposed. He was replaced by Clement Attlee, who at first opposed rearmament by advocating the abolition of national armaments and a world peacekeeping force under the direction of the League of Nations. However, with the rising threat from Nazi Germany and the ineffectiveness of the League of Nations, that policy eventually lost credibility, and in 1937, Ernest Bevin and Hugh Dalton persuaded the party to support rearmament and oppose appeasement.

A few on the left said that Chamberlain looked forward to a war between Germany and the Soviet Union. Attlee claimed in one political speech in 1937 that the National Government had connived at German rearmament "because of its hatred of Russia". British communists, following the party line defined by Joseph Stalin, argued that appeasement had been a pro-fascist policy and that the British ruling class preferred fascism to socialism. The Communist MP Willie Gallacher said that "many prominent representatives of the Conservative Party, speaking for powerful landed and financial interests in the country, would welcome Hitler and the German Army if they believed that such was the only alternative to the establishment of Socialism in this country".

=== Public opinion ===
British public opinion had been strongly opposed to war and rearmament in the early 1930s, but that began to shift by mid-decade. At a debate at the Oxford Union Society in 1933, a group of undergraduates passed a motion saying that they would not fight for King and country, which persuaded some in Germany that Britain would never go to war. Baldwin told the House of Commons that in 1933, he had been unable to pursue a policy of rearmament because of the strong pacifist sentiment in the country. In 1935, eleven million responded to the League of Nations "Peace Ballot" by pledging support for the reduction of armaments by international agreement. On the other hand, the same survey also found that 58.7% of British voters favoured "collective military sanctions" against aggressors, and public reaction to the Hoare-Laval Pact with Mussolini was extremely unfavorable. Even the left wing of the pacifist movement quickly began to turn with the outbreak of the Spanish Civil War in 1936, and many peace-balloters began signing up for the International Brigades to fight Franco. By the height of the Spanish conflict in 1937, the majority of young pacifists had modified their views to accept that war could be a legitimate response to aggression and fascism.

Czechoslovakia did not concern most people until mid-September 1938, when they began to object to a small democratic state being bullied. Nevertheless, the initial response of the British public to the Munich agreement was generally favourable. As Chamberlain left for Munich in 1938, the whole House of Commons cheered him noisily. On 30 September, on his return to Britain, Chamberlain delivered his famous "peace for our time" speech to delighted crowds. He was invited by the royal family onto the balcony at Buckingham Palace before he had reported to Parliament. The agreement was supported by most of the press, with only Reynold's News and the Daily Worker dissenting. In Parliament, the Labour Party opposed the agreement. Some Conservatives abstained in the vote, but the only MP to advocate war was the Conservative Duff Cooper, who had resigned from the government to protest the agreement.

=== Role of media ===
Positive opinion of appeasement was shaped partly by media manipulation. The German correspondent for The Times, Norman Ebbutt, charged that his persistent reports about Nazi militarism had been suppressed by his editor, Geoffrey Dawson. Historians such as Richard Cockett, William Shirer and Frank McDonough have confirmed the claim. The results of an October 1938 Gallup poll, which showed 86% of the public believed Hitler was lying about his future territorial ambitions, was censored from the News Chronicle at the last minute by the publisher, who was loyal to Chamberlain. For the few journalists who were asking challenging questions about appeasement, primarily members of the foreign press, Chamberlain often froze them out or intimidated them. When asked at press conferences about Hitler's abuse of Jews and other minority groups, he went so far as to denounce these reports as "Jewish-Communist propaganda".

Chamberlain's direct manipulation of the BBC was sustained and egregious. For example, Lord Halifax told radio producers not to offend Hitler and Mussolini, and they complied by censoring anti-fascist commentary made by Labour and Popular Front MPs. The BBC also suppressed the fact that 15,000 people protested the prime minister in Trafalgar Square as he returned from Munich in 1938 (10,000 more than welcomed him at 10 Downing Street). The BBC radio producers continued to censor news of persecution of Jews even after the war broke out, as Chamberlain still held out hopes of a quick armistice and did not want to inflame the atmosphere. As Richard Cockett noted:

[Chamberlain] had successfully demonstrated how a government in a democracy could influence and control the press to a remarkable degree. The danger in this for Chamberlain was that he preferred to forget that he exercised such influence, and so increasingly mistook his pliant press for real public opinion... the truth of the matter was that by controlling the press he was merely ensuring that the press was unable to reflect public opinion.

The journalist Shiela Grant Duff's Penguin Special, Europe and the Czechs, was published and distributed to every MP on the day that Chamberlain returned from Munich. Her book was a spirited defence of the Czech nation and a detailed criticism of British policy and confronted the need for war if necessary. It was influential and widely read. Although she argued against the policy of "peace at almost any price", she did not take a personal tone, unlike Guilty Men two years later.

=== At start of World War II ===
Once Germany invaded Poland and so ignited World War II, consensus was that appeasement was responsible. The Labour MP Hugh Dalton identified the policy with wealthy people in the City of London, Conservatives and members of the peerage who were soft on Hitler. The appointment of Churchill as Prime Minister after the Norway Debate hardened opinion against appeasement and encouraged the search for those responsible. Three British journalists, Michael Foot, Frank Owen and Peter Howard, writing under the name of "Cato" in their book Guilty Men, called for the removal from office of 15 public figures they held accountable, including Chamberlain. The book defined appeasement as the "deliberate surrender of small nations in the face of Hitler's blatant bullying". It was hastily written and has few claims to historical scholarship, but Guilty Men shaped subsequent thinking about appeasement, and it is said that it contributed to the defeat of the Conservatives in the 1945 general election.

The change in the meaning of "appeasement" after Munich was summarised later by the historian David Dilks: "The word in its normal meaning connotes the pacific settlement of disputes; in the meaning usually applied to the period of Neville Chamberlain['s] premiership, it has come to indicate something sinister, the granting from fear or cowardice of unwarranted concessions in order to buy temporary peace at someone else's expense."

=== Postwar historians ===
Historians have subsequently explained Chamberlain's policies in various ways. It could be said that he believed sincerely that the objectives of Hitler and Mussolini were limited, and that the settlement of their grievances would protect the world from war since for safety, military and air power should be strengthened.

One of the first dissents to the prevailing criticism of appeasement was made by John F. Kennedy in his 1940 Harvard College thesis, Why England Slept, in which he argued that appeasement had been necessary because the United Kingdom and France were unprepared for a world war.

In 1961, the view of appeasement as avoidable error and cowardice was similarly set on its head by A.J.P. Taylor in his book The Origins of the Second World War. Taylor argued that Hitler did not have a blueprint for war and behaved much as any other German leader might have. Appeasement was an active policy, not a passive one, and allowing Hitler to consolidate was a policy implemented by "men confronted with real problems, doing their best in the circumstances of their time". Taylor said that appeasement ought to be seen as a rational response to an unpredictable leader that was both diplomatically and politically appropriate to the time.

His view has been shared by other historians. For example, Paul Kennedy, who says of the choices facing politicians at the time, "Each course brought its share of disadvantages: there was only a choice of evils. The crisis in the British global position by this time was such that it was, in the last resort, insoluble, in the sense that there was no good or proper solution". Martin Gilbert expressed a similar view: "At bottom, the old appeasement was a mood of hope, Victorian in its optimism, Burkean in its belief that societies evolved from bad to good and that progress could only be for the better. The new appeasement was a mood of fear, Hobbesian in its insistence upon swallowing the bad in order to preserve some remnant of the good, pessimistic in its belief that Nazism was there to stay and, however horrible it might be, should be accepted as a way of life with which Britain ought to deal".

The arguments in Taylor's Origins of the Second World War, which have sometimes been described as "revisionist", were rejected by many historians at the time, and reviews of his book in Britain and the United States were generally critical. Nevertheless, he was praised for some of his insights. He challenged the dominant belief that the appeasers constituted a tiny, degenerate cabal that had somehow taken control of the British government in the 1930s and imposed its will against overwhelming public opposition. He demonstrated that appeasement enjoyed popular support and that British foreign policy continued unchanged after 1933. Also, by portraying the leaders of the 1930s as real people attempting to deal with real problems, he made the first strides towards explaining the actions of the appeasers, rather than merely condemning them.

In the early 1990s a new theory of appeasement, sometimes called "counter-revisionist", emerged as historians argued that appeasement was probably the only choice for the British government in the 1930s but that it was poorly implemented, carried out too late and not enforced strongly enough to constrain Hitler. Appeasement was considered a viable policy because of the strains that the British Empire faced in recuperating from World War I, and Chamberlain was said to have adopted a policy suitable to Britain's cultural and political needs. Frank McDonough is a leading proponent of that view of appeasement, which was described his book Neville Chamberlain, Appeasement and the British Road to War as a "post revisionist" study. Appeasement was a crisis management strategy seeking a peaceful settlement of Hitler's grievances. "Chamberlain's worst error", says McDonough, "was to believe that he could march Hitler on the yellow brick road to peace when in reality Hitler was marching very firmly on the road to war". He criticised revisionist historians for concentrating on Chamberlain's motivations, rather than how appeasement worked in practice, as a "usable policy" to deal with Hitler. James P. Levy argues against the outright condemnation of appeasement. "Knowing what Hitler did later", he writes, "the critics of Appeasement condemn the men who tried to keep the peace in the 1930s, men who could not know what would come later.... The political leaders responsible for Appeasement made many errors. They were not blameless. But what they attempted was logical, rational, and humane".

The view of Chamberlain colluding with Hitler to attack the Soviet Union has persisted, however, particularly on the far left. In 1999, Christopher Hitchens wrote that Chamberlain "had made a cold calculation that Hitler should be re-armed... partly to encourage his 'tough-minded' solution to the Bolshevik problem in the East". Consciously encouraging war with Stalin is not widely accepted to be a motive of the Downing Street appeasers, but there is a historical consensus that anti-communism was central to appeasement's appeal for the conservative elite. As Antony Beevor writes, "The policy of appeasement was not Neville Chamberlin's invention. Its roots lay in a fear of bolshevism. The general strike of 1926 and the depression made the possibility of revolution a very real concern to conservative politicians. As a result, they had mixed feelings towards the German and Italian regimes which had crushed the communists and socialists in their own countries".

=== Postwar politicians ===
Statesmen in the postwar years have often referred to their opposition to appeasement as a justification for firm, sometimes armed, action in international relations.

==== United States ====
U.S. President Harry S. Truman thus explained his decision to enter the Korean War in 1950, John F. Kennedy on his "quarantine" of Cuba in 1962, Lyndon B. Johnson in his resistance to communism in the 1960s, Ronald Reagan in his air strike on Libya in 1986, and Donald Trump in the drone strike that led to the assassination of Qasem Soleimani in 2020 were all efforts to avoid appeasement.

==== United Kingdom ====
British Prime Minister Anthony Eden invoked the memory of the Munich Agreement and opposed what he characterized as "appeasement" during the Suez Crisis of 1956. In a statement to the House of Commons on 12 September 1956, Eden argued that the British government would not pursue a policy of "abject appeasement" toward Gamal Abdel Nasser, following Egypt's nationalization of the Suez Canal. In the Commons debate the following day, Eden defended his comparison between the Suez dispute and the events of the 1930s, while opponents argued that the situations involving Nasser and Adolf Hitler were not comparable. Historians have subsequently noted that Eden's determination to avoid a repetition of the perceived failures of appeasement influenced his approach to the Suez crisis, although the extent and significance of that influence remain debated.

==== Vietnam ====
After the Viet Minh won the Battle of Dien Bien Phu in 1954, U.S. President Dwight D. Eisenhower wrote in a letter to British Prime Minister Churchill, "We failed to halt Hirohito, Mussolini and Hitler by not acting in unity and in time. That marked the beginning of many years of stark tragedy and desperate peril. May it not be that our nations have learned something from that lesson?" Similarly, President Lyndon Johnson said to defend the Vietnam War, "Everything I knew about history told me that if I got out of Vietnam and let Ho Chi Minh run through the streets of Saigon, then I'd be doing exactly what Chamberlain did in World War II. I'd be giving a big fat reward to aggression".

==== Cuba ====
During the Cuban Missile Crisis, U.S. Air Force Chief of Staff Curtis LeMay and various hawks within the Kennedy administration for an air strike on Soviet nuclear missiles in Cuba compared Kennedy's hesitance to do so to appeasement. That was partially a jab at Kennedy's father Joseph P. Kennedy Sr., who had supported appeasement while he was U.S. Ambassador to the United Kingdom and later supported a negotiated surrender to Germany during the May 1940 War Cabinet Crisis and the Battle of Britain.

==== Soviet Union ====
During the Cold War, the "lessons" of appeasement were cited by prominent conservative allies of Reagan, who urged him to be assertive in "rolling back" Soviet-backed regimes throughout the world. The Heritage Foundation's Michael Johns, for instance, wrote in 1987 that "seven years after Ronald Reagan's arrival in Washington, the United States government and its allies are still dominated by the culture of appeasement that drove Neville Chamberlain to Munich in 1938." Some conservatives even compared Reagan to Chamberlain after his withdrawal of the Multinational Force in Lebanon because of the 1983 Beirut barracks bombing.

==== Argentina ====
British Prime Minister Margaret Thatcher invoked the example of Churchill during the Falklands War of 1982: "When the American Secretary of State, Alexander Haig, urged her to reach a compromise with the Argentines she rapped sharply on the table and told him, pointedly, 'that this was the table at which Neville Chamberlain sat in 1938 and spoke of the Czechs as a faraway people about whom we know so little'". Thatcher, along with U.S. National Security Advisor Brent Scowcroft, made similar arguments after the 1990 Iraqi invasion of Kuwait and the planning for the Gulf War. The spectre of appeasement was raised in discussions of the Yugoslav wars of the 1990s.

==== Iraq ====
U.S. President George W. Bush and British Prime Minister Tony Blair also cited Churchill's warnings about German rearmament to justify their action in the run-up to the 2003 Iraq War.

==== Syria ====
In 2013, Obama administration officials such as Secretary of State John Kerry and Secretary of Defense Chuck Hagel claimed that a failure of the United States to intervene in the Syrian Civil War after the Ghouta chemical attack would be an act of appeasement towards Bashar al-Assad.

==== Iran ====
In May 2008, U.S. President George W. Bush cautioned against "the false comfort of appeasement" when dealing with Iran and Iranian President Mahmoud Ahmadinejad. Opponents of President Barack Obama later criticized the Joint Comprehensive Plan of Action as an act of appeasement with Iran. U.S. Secretary of State Mike Pompeo later stated that the first Trump administration's foreign policy was "trying to correct for what was the Obama administration's appeasement of Iran."

==== China ====
Tibetan separatists consider the policy of the West towards the People's Republic of China with regard to Tibet as appeasement.

==== Russia ====
Some argue that Vladimir Putin was encouraged to launch a full-scale invasion of the rest of Ukraine in 2022 due to minimal international reactions to the invasion of Chechnya, the invasion of Georgia, the 2014 annexation of Crimea, and the conflict in the Donbas. Some commentators have suggested that some NATO countries are following the policy of appeasement towards Vladimir Putin's Russia by rejecting the support of Ukrainian democracy through military operations and aid during the 2022 Russian invasion of Ukraine.

From the beginning of his second term, Donald Trump recognized all Russian conquests in Ukraine. This policy was described as the betrayal of Ukraine, capitulation to Russia, or, more commonly, "appeasement." A chorus of voices in European capitals warned the US president that such concessions amount to "appeasement." British former Defence Secretary, Ben Wallace, associated the policy of Trump with Chamberlain’s ‘peace for our time’ moment. For Timothy Garton Ash, Trump’s "appeasement" of Vladimir Putin made Chamberlain look like a "principled, courageous realist." Now, Ash continues, "we see that Trump not only bullies his country’s friends but sucks up to his country’s enemies." Contrary to 1938, the War is already raging. Hence, Ash suggested imagining Franklin Roosevelt making similar concessions to Hitler in 1941. The EU’s top diplomat, Kaja Kallas, noted that appeasement never worked. Kallas' generalization might be exaggerated, but on the occasion the appeasement did not work as planned. Russia kept pounding Ukraine. "Vladimir, STOP," begged Trump on Twitter. The appeal was ignored, Vladimir did not stop. Instead, Russia unleashed the largest aerial attack on Ukrainian cities since the War began. Having run the experiment with appeasement for half a year, Trump summed up: All negotiations with Vladimir Putin sound nice, "but it turns out to be meaningless." In August 2025, Trump appeared to resume appeasement when he hosted Putin in brief bilateral talks in Anchorage, Alaska, without hosting Ukrainian or European delegations. By the end of the three-hour meeting, Trump had rejected his previously espoused stance and adopted the Russian position of rejecting an immediate ceasefire in Ukraine, without securing any major concessions for Ukraine or the United States.

==== Afghanistan ====
The 2020 Doha Agreement between the United States and the Taliban without involvement of the then Afghan government was criticized as the American appeasement of the Taliban. During the American war in Afghanistan, the United States and its NATO allies in the ISAF and RSM periods, alongside the government of the Islamic Republic of Afghanistan and its national defense and security forces, fought the Taliban and allied militant groups, then the Islamic State – Khorasan Province. After Donald Trump become the president, he decided to wrap up all military operations in Afghanistan and to begin negotiation with the Taliban, which culminated with the Doha Agreement on 29 February 2020. When President Joe Biden ordered the withdrawal of all U.S. troops from Afghanistan on 31 August 2021, the Taliban began their final offensive, causing the Islamic Republic of Afghanistan to collapse; the Taliban seized Kabul on 15 August 2021. The United States completed its withdrawal from Afghanistan and the evacuation of American citizens and residents and at-risk Afghans from Kabul International Airport on 30 August 2021.

== Criticism ==
In the mid-20th century, appeasement was seen as discredited in the United Kingdom due to its role in contributing to World War II.

Scholar Aaron McKeil pointed out that appeasement restraint against liberal interventionism would lead to more proxy wars, and fail to offer institutions and norms for mitigating great power conflict. Alternative strategies to avoid conflict include deterrence, where threats or limited force dissuades an actor from escalating conflict, typically because the prospective attacker believes that the probability of success is low and the costs of attack are high.

Appeasement can be seen as promoting frozen conflicts and rewarding aggression from a game-theoretical point of view. If the defensive player is willing to appease, the offensive player is incentivised to create the conditions to be appeased by their opponent.

Appeasement might be more difficult to achieve if the source of conflict is indivisible and can be held by only one party, preventing small concessions.

The distribution of economic resources to veterans and political groups in Timor-Leste to resolve the 2006 crisis can be seen as appeasement – avoiding conflict without addressing the underlying grievances.

The Minsk agreements, which failed to prevent the 2022 full-scale phase of the Russian invasion of Ukraine, were suggested in 2015 by Der Spiegel to be appeasement, and were stated in 2024 by Alya Shandra of Euromaidan Press to have been appeasement.

Appeasement can face the dilemma where appeasing a group of former rebels can increase grievances with new groups.

== See also ==
- Confidence-building measures
- Containment
- Danegeld
- Détente
- Deterrence theory
- Finlandization
- Game theory
- Global Peace Index
- Hardline
- International relations (1919–1939)
- Mutual assured destruction
- Peace through strength
- Realpolitik
- Right of conquest
- Trust, but verify
- Why die for Danzig?
- Why England Slept

== Sources ==
- Grant Duff, Sheila (1938). Europe and the Czechs. London: Penguin.
