= Lesson of Munich =

Appeasement of Adolf Hitler at the Munich Conference

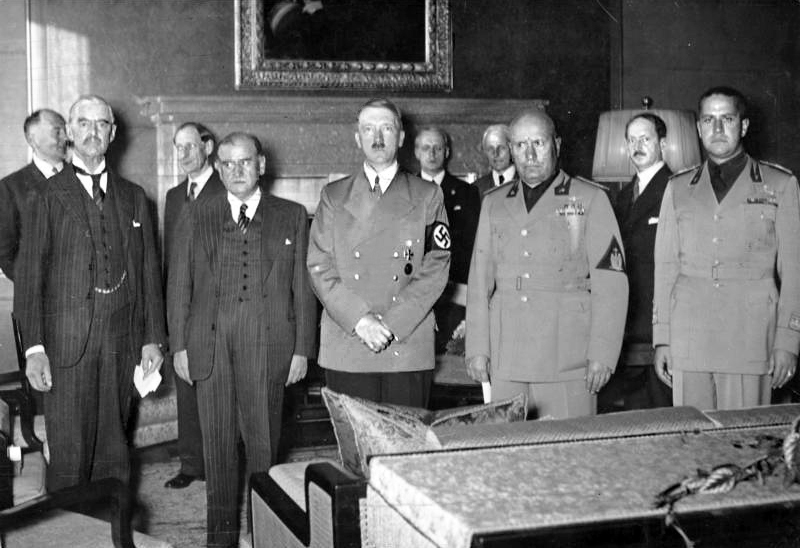
The Munich Conference

The lesson of Munich, in international relations, refers to the appeasement of Adolf Hitler at the Munich Conference in September 1938. To avoid war, France and the United Kingdom permitted Nazi Germany to incorporate the Sudetenland. Earlier acts of appeasement included the Allied inaction towards the remilitarization of the Rhineland and the Anschluss of Austria, while subsequent ones included inaction to the First Vienna Award, the annexation of the remainder of Czech Lands to form the Protectorate of Bohemia and Moravia, as well as the 1939 German ultimatum to Lithuania forcing it to cede the Klaipėda Region.

The policy of appeasement underestimated Hitler's ambitions by believing that enough concessions would secure a lasting peace. Today, the agreement is widely regarded as a failed act of appeasement towards Germany, and a diplomatic triumph for Hitler. It facilitated the German takeover of Czechoslovakia and caused Hitler to believe that the Western Allies would not risk war over Poland the following year, an assessment openly expressed in his famous quotation: "I saw my enemies in Munich, and they are worms", which proved partially correct in light of the popularity of the slogan Why die for Danzig? in France and, crucially, the events known as the Phoney War.

== Background ==
The foreign policy of British Prime Minister Neville Chamberlain has become inextricably linked with the events of the Munich Crisis. The policy of appeasement and Chamberlain's announcement of a Peace for our time has resonated through the following decades as a parable of diplomatic failure. Together with "Waterloo" and "Versailles", the Munich Agreement has come to signify a disastrous diplomatic outcome. The lessons of Munich have profoundly shaped Western foreign policy ever since. US presidents have cited those lessons as justifications for war in Korea, Vietnam and Iraq.

In the United States and the United Kingdom, the words "Munich" and "appeasement" are frequently invoked when demanding forthright, often military, action to resolve an international crisis and characterising a political opponent who condemns negotiation as weakness. After the 1986 bombing of Libya, US President Ronald Reagan argued, "Europeans who remember their history understand better than most that there is no security, no safety, in the appeasement of evil." Although appeasement, which is conventionally defined as the act of satisfying grievances by concessions with the aim of avoiding war, was once regarded as an effective and even honourable strategy of foreign policy, the term has since the Munich Conference symbolised cowardice, failure and weakness. Winston Churchill described appeasement as "one who feeds a crocodile, hoping it will eat him last".

The policies have been the subject of intense debate ever since. Historians' assessments have ranged from condemnation for allowing Germany to grow too strong to believing that Germany was so strong that it might well win a war and so postponement of a showdown was in the best interests of Britain and France. The historian Andrew Roberts argues in 2019 regarding British historians, "Indeed, it is the generally accepted view in Britain today that they were right at least to have tried".

In the same vein, Robert Williamson noted, "Britons and French were deeply traumatized by the horrors of the First World War, and felt quite correctly that their leaders in 1914 had let themselves be drawn, far too easily, into terrible war. The Munich Agreement made sure that no one would think so again. In 1940, when Londoners had to endure the intensive German bombing, no one could say that Britain did not try to avoid this war.... Indeed, Czechoslovakia was abandoned. But when Britain and France did go to war in 1939, they were still unable to save Poland from being conquered and occupied. Clearly, had they gone to war a year earlier, they would not have been able to save Czechoslovakia, either".

== Munich analogies ==
"Munich and appeasement", in the words of scholars Fredrik Logevall and Kenneth Osgood, "have become among the dirtiest words in American politics, synonymous with naivete and weakness, and signifying a craven willingness to barter away the nation's vital interests for empty promises." They claimed that the success of US foreign policy often depends upon a president withstanding "the inevitable charges of appeasement that accompany any decision to negotiate with hostile powers." The presidents who challenged the "tyranny of Munich" have often achieved policy breakthroughs and those who had cited Munich as a principle of US foreign policy had often led the nation into its "most enduring tragedies."

Many later crises were accompanied by cries of "Munich" from politicians and the media. In 1960, the conservative US Senator Barry Goldwater used "Munich" to describe a domestic political issue by saying that an attempt by the Republican Party to appeal to liberals was "the Munich of the Republican Party." In 1962, General Curtis LeMay told US President John F. Kennedy that his refusal to bomb Cuba during the Cuban Missile Crisis was "almost as bad as the appeasement at Munich", a pointed barb given that his father Joseph P. Kennedy Sr. had supported appeasement in general in his capacity as Ambassador to Britain. In 1965, US President Lyndon Johnson, in justifying increased military action in Vietnam, stated, "We learned from Hitler and Munich that success only feeds the appetite for aggression."

The West German policy of staying neutral in the Arab–Israeli conflict after the Munich massacre and the following hijack of the Lufthansa Flight 615 in 1972, rather than taking a pro-Israel position, led to Israeli comparisons with the Munich Agreement of appeasement.

Citing Munich in debates on foreign policy has continued to be common in the 21st century. During negotiations for the Iran nuclear agreement mediated by Secretary of State John Kerry, Representative John Culberson, a Texas Republican Representative, tweeted the message "Worse than Munich." Kerry had himself invoked Munich in a speech in France advocating military action in Syria by saying, "This is our Munich moment."

More recently, the phrase has been evoked in criticisms of Western passivity to Russia's invasions of Georgia and Ukraine.

== See also ==
- Western betrayal
