= Godesberg Memorandum =

Document issued by Adolf Hitler

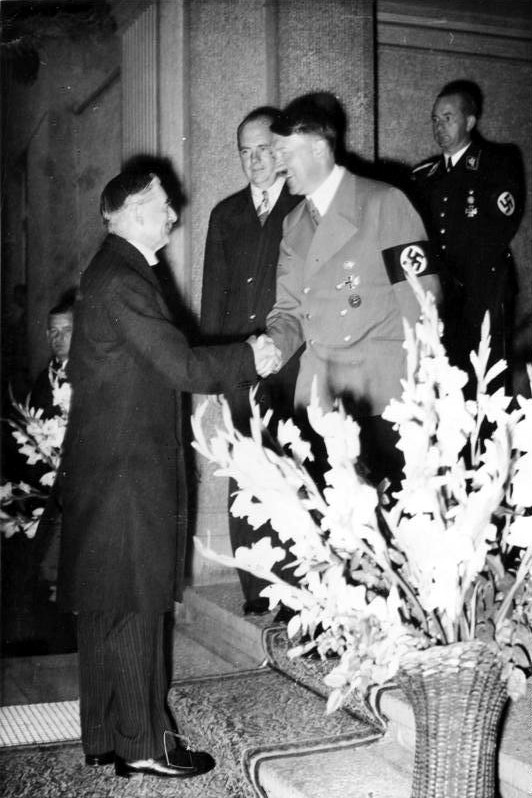
Hitler greets Chamberlain at Bad Godesberg, 24 September 1938

The Godesberg Memorandum is a document issued by Adolf Hitler in the early hours of 24 September 1938 concerning the Sudetenland and amounting to an ultimatum addressed to the government of Czechoslovakia.

It was named after Bad Godesberg, where Hitler had met Neville Chamberlain for long talks on 23 September continuing into the next day.

== Background ==
At the time of the collapse of the Austro-Hungarian Empire, the Sudetenland was a German-speaking part of the Empire which fell to the new state of Czechoslovakia, itself dominated by the Czechs. Initially, many Sudeten Germans wished to become part of the new German-speaking state of German Austria, and later they hoped to join Austria. However, the Treaty of Saint-Germain of 1919 confirmed the inclusion of the German-speaking territories within Czechoslovakia. By the beginning of 1938 most Sudetens aspired to be integrated into Nazi Germany.

Following an active propaganda campaign, Adolf Hitler began publicly to demand the "return" to Germany of a large part of the Sudetenland containing some three million German speakers. In March 1938 France and the Soviet Union gave guarantees of military support to Czechoslovakia if Hitler began to use military force to seize the Sudetenland, but on 24 March Neville Chamberlain refused a French request to give the same pledge.

In early September 1938, Chamberlain sent Lord Runciman to attempt to negotiate a settlement of the crisis between the Germans and the Czechs. On 7 September the Sudeten Germans, led by Konrad Henlein, broke off the talks with Runciman, and on 12 September Hitler publicly advised the Sudetenlanders to stand firm for union with Germany. On 15 September Chamberlain flew to Berchtesgaden to meet Hitler, who demanded self determination for the Sudetenland. Upon his return to London after his Berchtesgaden summit, Chamberlain told his Cabinet that Hitler's aims were "strictly limited" to the Sudetenland and he felt it was quite possible to avoid war provided everyone played their part. He also had discussions with the French, in which he agreed with them a joint proposal to all parties for the gradual transfer to Germany of the areas which had a majority of Sudeten Germans.

Chamberlain returned to Germany, meeting Hitler on 22 and 23 September at Bad Godesberg to propose this solution. In presenting their peace plan for the transfer of the Sudetenland, the British delegation was most unpleasantly surprised to hear Hitler reject the terms he had himself presented at Berchtesgaden as now unacceptable. Hitler now demanded an immediate transfer, including occupation of the Sudetenland by German forces, and he quickly issued the "Godesberg Memorandum" to clarify his public position.

== Content ==
In his Memorandum Hitler proposed a plebiscite, without identifying the exact area for it, and provided for the plebiscite areas to be occupied by both German and Czech forces, pending the outcome of voting. German forces should enter the Sudetenland by 1 October. Hitler demanded the Sudetenland be ceded to Germany no later than 28 September 1938 with no negotiations between Prague and Berlin and no international commission to oversee the transfer; no plebiscites to be held in the transferred districts until after the transfer; and he also declared that Germany would not abandon war as an option until all the claims against Czechoslovakia by Poland and Hungary had been satisfied. This was seen as a signal that Hitler had decided to put an end to Chamberlain's peace-making efforts. The arrangements for the transfer were to be decided bilaterally between the Germans and the Czechs and by no one else.

The "memorandum" stated an ultimatum for Czech acceptance of it, expiring at 2 pm on 28 September 1938. If the Czech government would not agree to Hitler's demands by then, Germany would take the Sudetenland by force. Chamberlain protested about being presented with an ultimatum, to which Hitler replied that the document was entitled "Memorandum", so could not be called an ultimatum.

== Response and outcome ==
The Czechs announced on 28 September that they rejected the Memorandum, and the French ordered the mobilization of 600,000 men. The Royal Navy was also mobilized the same day.

Although Hitler was angry at the rejection of his memorandum, he also feared a war against both Britain and France. He did not order an invasion on 28 September, having instead agreed to Chamberlain's proposal for a further meeting the next day, now at Munich, between four heads of government, Chamberlain for Britain, Hitler for Germany, Prime Minister Daladier for France and Mussolini for Italy, with no Czech or Soviet participation. On 1 October, a pact was signed which provided for possession of the Sudeten Province to be transferred to Germany, with Britain and France seeking to sweeten this bitter pill for the Czechs by guaranteeing the new borders of Czechoslovakia. There was also a separate agreement between the British and the Germans that stated that all future disputes between them would be the subject of negotiation.

On 1 October, German troops marched into the Sudetenland, which was immediately incorporated into Germany. Some 115,000 Sudeten Czechs and 30,000 Sudeten Germans, including Social Democrats, Communists and Jews, fled to what was left of Czechoslovakia. By 1 March 1939, the number of refugees, as reported by the Institute for Refugee Assistance, stood at almost 150,000.

== Chronology ==
- 10 September 1938 — In a speech at Nuremberg, Hermann Göring calls the Czechs a "miserable pygmy race" who are "harassing the human race". That evening Edvard Beneš, President of Czechoslovakia, broadcasts an appeal for calm.
- 15 September — Chamberlain arrives in Berchtesgaden to begin negotiations with Hitler
- 17 September — Chamberlain returns to London to confer with his cabinet.
- 22 September — Chamberlain arrives in Bad Godesberg for further talks with Hitler over the crisis. Hitler demands a German occupation of all German Sudeten territories by 1 October. That night, after a telephone conference, Chamberlain reverses his position and advises the Czechoslovaks to mobilize for war.
- 23 September - At 22:30 The Czechoslovak Government orders general mobilization. By 30 September more than 1 million men were prepared to defend the country
- 24 September — At 1:30 am Hitler and Chamberlain conclude their talks and Chamberlain agrees to take Hitler's demands, codified in the Godesberg Memorandum, to the Czechoslovak Government himself.
- 25 September — The Czechs, the British cabinet, and the French government, reject the demands in the Memorandum and the French order a partial mobilization of their army.
- 26 September — In a speech in Berlin, Hitler hints that war with Czechoslovakia will begin at any moment.
- 28 September — As his deadline of 1 October for a German occupation of the Sudetenland approaches, Hitler invites Chamberlain, Benito Mussolini of Italy, and Edouard Daladier of France, to a final conference in Munich. The Czechs are not invited. Royal Navy is mobilized for war.
- 29 September Carl Friedrich Goerdeler informs Colonel Graham Christie, assistant British military attaché in Berlin, that the mobilization of the Royal Navy has badly damaged the popularity of the Nazi regime, as Germans realize that Fall Grün is leading towards war.
- 29 September — Munich Agreement: The German, Italian, British and French heads of government agree to the German demands regarding the annexation of the Sudetenland. Czechoslovakia is not a signatory to the agreement.
- 30 September — Neville Chamberlain returns to London and declares "Peace for our time".
- 1 October — German troops march into the Sudetenland. The Polish government gives the Czech government an ultimatum stating that Trans-Olza region must be handed over within twenty-four hours. The Czechs have little choice but to comply. Polish forces occupy Trans-Olza.
- 5 October — In the House of Commons Winston Churchill calls the outcome of the crisis "A total and unmitigated defeat". France and Britain had to choose between war and dishonour. They chose dishonour. They will have war".
- 16 October — Germany expels 12,000 Polish Jews from Germany; Poland accepts 4,000 and refuses admission to the remaining 8,000, who are left in the "no-man's land" at the German-Polish frontier.
- 24 October — At Berchtesgaden, foreign minister Joachim von Ribbentrop tells Józef Lipski, Polish ambassador to Germany, that the Free City of Danzig must return to Germany, the Germans must be given extraterritorial rights in the Polish Corridor, and that Poland must sign the Anti-Comintern Pact.
