= Why die for Danzig? =

French anti-war slogan

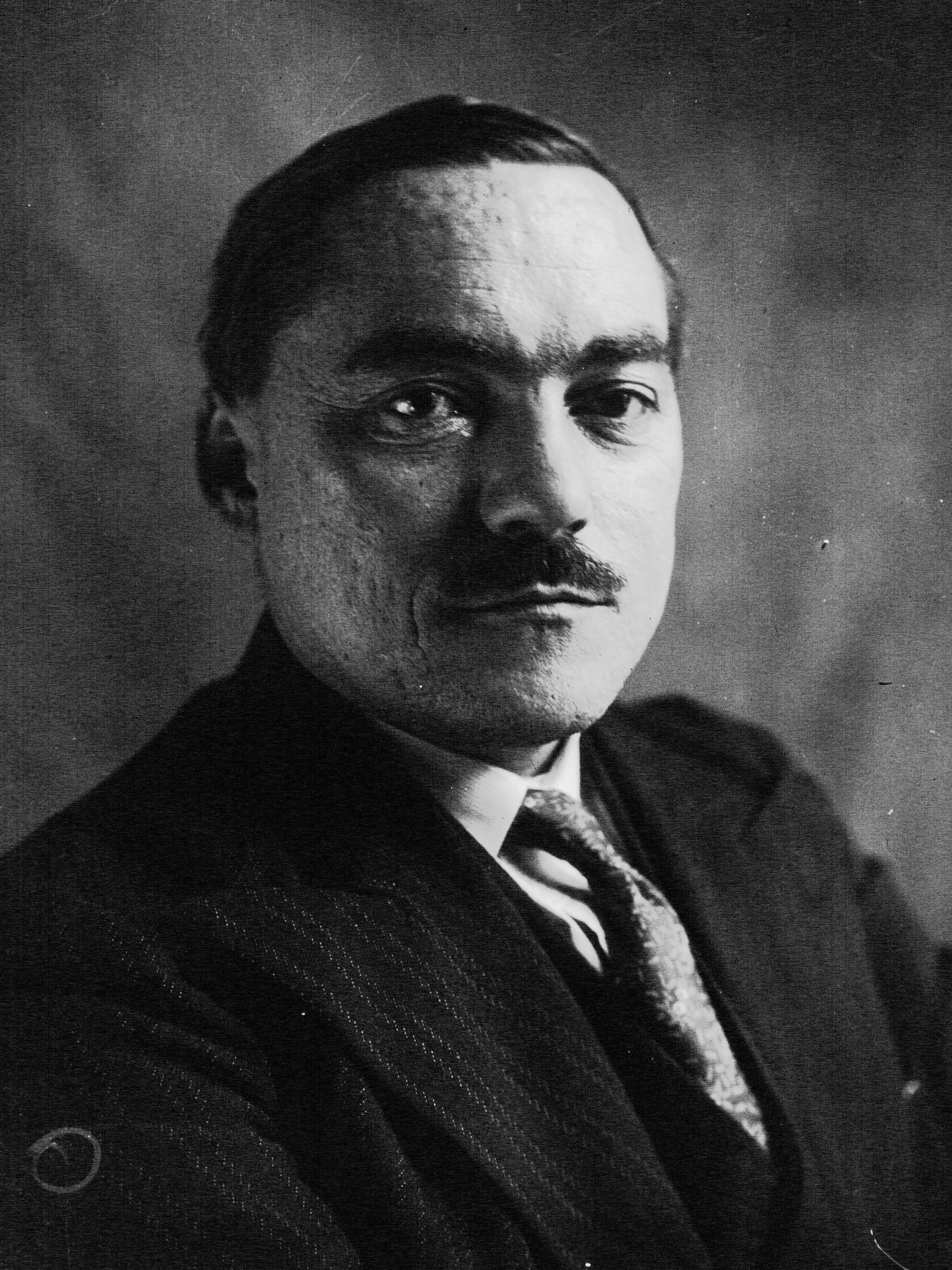
Marcel Déat, who coined the phrase

"Why die for Danzig?" (French: Pourquoi mourir pour Dantzig ?) is a pro-appeasement anti-war French political slogan created on the eve of World War II, coined by Marcel Déat, a French journalist, politician, and leader of Neosocialism, the right-wing tendency of the SFIO, who eventually became a fascist sympathizer and a collaborationist leader during the Nazi occupation of France.

== Article ==
The phrase originated in the title of the column (Mourir pour Dantzig ?) by Déat, who published it on 4 May 1939 in the Parisian newspaper L'Œuvre. The article concerned one of the Nazi German ultimatums to the Second Polish Republic, regarding the demand to transfer control of the Free City of Danzig (now Gdańsk) to Germany.

In the article, Déat argued in favor of appeasement. He asserted that France had no interest in defending Poland, and that German Chancellor Adolf Hitler would be satisfied after receiving the territory he demanded, rightfully according to Déat. He accused the Poles of warmongering and dragging Europe into a war. Déat argued that Frenchmen should not be called to die paying for irresponsible Polish politicking, and expressed doubts about whether Poland would be able to fight for any significant amount of time. Déat wrote, "To fight alongside our Polish friends for the common defense of our territories, of our property, of our liberties, this is a perspective that one can courageously envisage, if it should contribute to maintaining the peace. But to die for Danzig, no!" (Mais mourir pour Dantzig, non!)

== Impact ==
Opinions on the significance and the impact of the slogan differ. The article and several similar pieces were noticed by diplomats and government officials, French and foreign, and elicited press releases from Prime Minister Édouard Daladier and Foreign Minister Georges Bonnet, who noted that this sentiment did not represent the majority views of either France's government or public, and reaffirmed their support for the Polish–French alliance.

The slogan has been credited by Henry Kissinger with demoralizing the French public in 1940, but historian David Gordon argues that it was mostly marginalized by that time. Historian Julian T. Jackson agrees, noting that while the slogan was taken up by some extremist groups, such as the British People's Party, for the most part at the time of being written it "fell largely on deaf ears". According to historian Karol Górski, Déat's article and the resulting slogan gained some popularity in France and abroad, and others list the groups among which it resonated, such as the French intelligentsia, far-right, and isolationists. It was however less popular among the general public; Thomas Sowell cites a French poll around that time showed that 76 per cent of the public was supportive of going to war over Danzig.

This slogan was particularly negatively received in Poland, and entered the Polish language as the phrase "umierać za Gdańsk", used as a type of informal fallacy, describing an argument nobody should agree with. It still appears in Polish political discourse and appears as a reference recognized by general public as of 2012. A number of modern Polish sources cite this slogan arguing it was the dominant viewpoint of the French and British publics, claiming that neither nation wished to go to war for an issue seen as minor or irrelevant. The phrase has also been occasionally used in modern French- and English-language political discourse. Back in 1939, the phrase was readily adopted by Nazi German propaganda, and used in French language broadcasts around the time of the Phoney War.

Following French defeat by Germany and the creation of the Vichy regime, Déat became an advocate of fascism and a Nazi collaborator, going so far as to look for support in Nazi Germany for his fascist party, which was more radical than the Vichy regime. The phrase was adapted into "Why pay for Ukraine?" and it (alongside the original phrase) has been commonly used to criticize Western isolationist sentiment in response to the 2022 Russian invasion of Ukraine.

== See also ==
- Isolationism
- Opposition to World War II
- Western betrayal
- Why England Slept
