= Frank McDonough =

English historian (born 1957)

- Born: 17 April 1957 (age 69); Liverpool, United Kingdom
- Occupation: Historian

Academic background
- Education: Balliol College, Oxford; Lancaster University

Academic work
- Discipline: History of Germany
- Institutions: Liverpool John Moores University

Frank McDonough (born 17 April 1957 in Liverpool, England) is a British historian of the Third Reich and international history.

== Life ==
McDonough studied modern History at Balliol College, Oxford, as a Senior Status Scholar. He later earned a PhD in history from Lancaster University, under the supervision of Ruth Henig. He was Professor of International History in the History Department of the School of Humanities and Social Science at Liverpool John Moores University until his retirement in 2021. He lives in Liverpool with his partner Ann.

== Work ==
=== Neville Chamberlain and appeasement ===
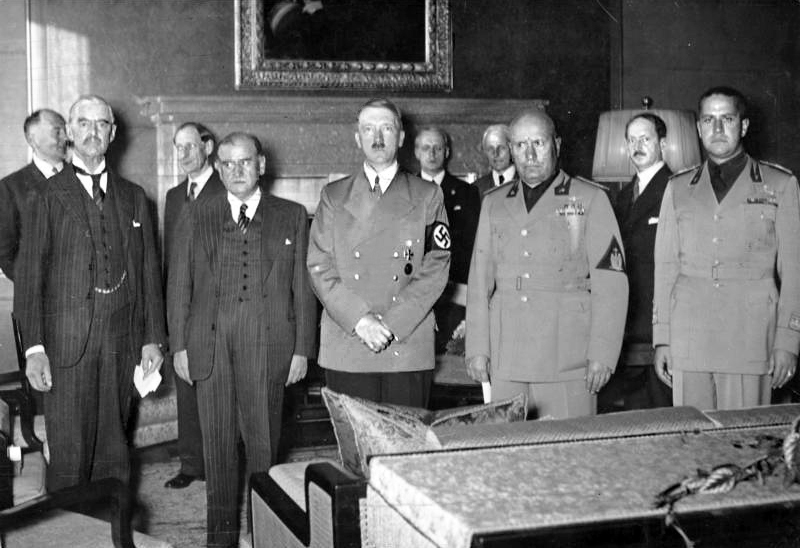
The Munich Conference. Chamberlain, Daladier, Hitler, Mussolini

His study of Neville Chamberlain, Appeasement and the British Road to War, published in 1998, was reviewed in academic journals. R. A. C. Parker described it as "very well written, with a lively argument, which explores appeasement in society too". Andrew Thorpe, described it as "a cogent and stimulating analysis of appeasement which will take the debate still deeper". Edward B. Segel wrote that it "brings out effectively how the British government manipulated the mass-media, the press and especially the BBC to exclude public criticism of Chamberlain's policies and convey the impression of overwhelming support".

McDonough is one of the most prominent 'post-revisionist' experts on Neville Chamberlain and the policy of appeasement, along with Parker, who was, as Sidney Aster points out, his "academic mentor while he was at Oxford".

=== Other books ===
In McDonough's 2007 monograph, The Conservative Party and Anglo-German Relations, 1905–1914, he moved the focus of analysis to the Conservative Party's role in the outbreak of the First World War. A German foreign policy scholar described the book in a review in The Bulletin of the German Institute of Historical Research as "a thorough and thought-provoking analysis, which draws on over thirty archives and provides a powerful and overdue corrective to the traditional depiction of the Edwardian Conservative Party as 'Scaremongers' and the chief promoters of Germanophobic views among British political parties in the years that led to the outbreak of the First World War".

McDonough's books include several on the Third Reich, including The Gestapo (2015), which according to a review in The Independent "question[s] how scary the Gestapo was to the ordinary German"; the reviewer in The Telegraph called it "brave" and "nuanced". His The Weimar Years (2023) is a prequel to his two-volume popular history of Germany under Hitler, The Hitler Years. He has also written textbooks including Fascism, Conflict and Communism, for the Oxford and Cambridge Examinations Board.

== Media appearances and Twitter ==
McDonough has appeared on TV and radio. He appeared on CrossTalk on Russia Today in 2010, debating whether the Second World War could have been prevented. He featured in the BBC One documentary A Tale of Two Rival Cities, which was part of the BBC's "History of the World" project, for which he also acted as Historical Consultant; the documentary won a Royal Television Society Award. He was interviewed in two special programmes on French National Television to mark the 70th anniversary of General de Gaulle's 18 June 1940 speech when he said the "flame of French Resistance cannot be extinguished". McDonough appeared as an historical commentator on France 2 and in a special documentary featuring historians on de Gaulle, broadcast on France 3 on 18 June 2010. He also appeared in the BBC One programme Inside Out commenting on a story presented by the actor Paul McGann that looked at whether or not Adolf Hitler visited Liverpool between November 1911 and May 1912. McDonough argued that evidence from Austrian police records, eyewitness accounts from Vienna, and shipping records all strongly indicated that the young Hitler had lived in Vienna at this time, not Liverpool, thus confirming what Hitler claimed in his autobiography, Mein Kampf. In 2012, McDonough appeared in three episodes of Nazi Secrets, a series on the history of the Third Reich on the National Geographic Channel: "Hitler's Damned Women", "Hitler's Family Skeletons" and "Hitler's Millions". In November 2013, McDonough was featured in a BBC One documentary called The Story of the Swastika and a Channel 5 documentary called 7 Days That Made the Führer. In 2014, McDonough appeared in a 10-part documentary series called The Rise of the Nazi Party on Quest TV, part of the Discovery Channel. In 2022, McDonough along with historians Tim Bouverie, John Bew, Richard Evans, Jonathan Haslam, and Andrew Roberts, contributed to the two part 2022 Odyssey Television documentary for the BBC Could Hitler Have Been Stopped? The Politics of Appeasement.

McDonough has a Twitter account under the handle @FXMC1957. In 2014 the History News Network ranked McDonough's Twitter in the Top 20 History Twitter accounts.

== Publications ==
- The British Empire, 1815–1914. Hodder and Stoughton, 1994, repr. Hodder Education, 2009, ISBN 9780340593769. Textbook.
- The Origins of the First and Second World Wars. Cambridge University Press, 1997, repr. 2014, ISBN 9780521568616. Textbook.
- Appeasement and the British Road to War, Manchester University Press, 1998, ISBN 9780719048326
- Hitler and Nazi Germany, Cambridge University Press, 1999, ISBN 9780521595025. Textbook.
- Conflict, Communism and Fascism: Europe 1890–1945, Cambridge University Press, 2001, ISBN 9780521777964. Textbook.
- Opposition and Resistance in Nazi Germany, Cambridge University Press, 2001, ISBN 9780521003582
- Hitler, Chamberlain and Appeasement, Cambridge University Press, 2002, ISBN 9780521000482. Textbook.
- Hitler and the Rise of the Nazi Party, Routledge, 2003, 2nd ed. 2017, ISBN 9781138425286. Textbook.
- The Conservative Party and Anglo-German Relations, 1905–1914, Palgrave Macmillan, 2007, ISBN 9780230517110
- With John Cochrane. The Holocaust, Palgrave Macmillan, 2008, ISBN 9780230203860
- Sophie Scholl: The Woman Who Defied Hitler, The History Press, 2009, ISBN 9780752455112
- Editor. The Origins of the Second World War: An international Perspective, Continuum, 2011, ISBN 9781441164438
- The Gestapo: The Myth and Reality of Hitler's Secret Police, Coronet–Hodder and Stoughton, 2015, ISBN 9781444778069
- The Hitler Years. 2 vols. Volume 1: Triumph 1933–1939, Apollo–Head of Zeus, 2019, ISBN 9781784975920. Volume 2: Disaster 1940–1945, 2020
- The Weimar Years: Rise and Fall 1918–1933, Apollo–Head of Zeus, 2023, ISBN 9781803284798
