= Sidney Aster =

Canadian academic

Sidney Aster FRHistS is a professor emeritus in the historical studies department at the University of Toronto Mississauga and a Fellow of the Royal Historical Society.

== Life ==
After graduating with a BA (History and Political Science) and MA (History) from McGill University, Montreal, he moved to London, England. He completed his PhD in International History at the London School of Economics and Political Science. He lectured for a year at the University of Glasgow, then returned to London to work as a freelance writer and historian. Among his assignments was to act as principal research assistant to Sir Martin Gilbert, who had succeeded Randolph Churchill as the official biographer of Sir Winston Churchill.

In the following years, Aster collaborated variously with V. V. Tilea, Romanian Minister to London, 1938-1940, Sir William Seeds, British Ambassador to Moscow, 1938-1941, and the British industrialist, A. P. Young, on the latter’s involvement with the German pre- and wartime resistance. For several years he also met weekly with Arthur Salter, 1st Baron Salter to discuss the latter’s multi-faceted career as an international civil servant, MP, cabinet minister, journalist and author. At the same time, he published three books in four years: 1939, The Making of the Second World War, Anthony Eden: A Biography, and The "X" Documents, The Secret History of Foreign Office Contacts with the German Resistance 1937-1939. He also acted as a book reviewer for The Daily Telegraph.

After 12 years in London, Aster returned to Canada in 1976 to take up a position with the Department of History, University of Toronto. His teaching interests ranged widely over the span of British history, 1485–present, Irish history from the beginnings to “the time of trouble,” the Welfare State, and diplomatic relations between the great powers.

During this period, Aster continued to publish extensively on appeasement and revisionism, Neville Chamberlain, and the origins of the Second World War. He also contributed to several essay collections, encyclopaedias, research guides and articles for academic journals. His latest publications include Appeasement and All Souls: A Portrait with Documents, 1937-1939, Dealing with Josef Stalin: The Moscow Blue Book, 1939, and a biography titled Power, Policy and Personality: The Life and Times of Lord Salter, 1881–1975.
