= Arms and the Covenant =

1938 book by Winston Churchill

- Author: Winston Churchill
- Subject: Great Britain—Foreign relations—20th century; Europe—Politics and government—1918–1945; Germany—Politics and government—1933–1945; Disarmament; Security, International
- Published: 1938 (George G. Harrap)
- Publication place: United Kingdom
- Pages: 465
- OCLC: 470130900
- Dewey Decimal: 942.084
- LC Class: DA566.7 .C53

Arms and the Covenant is a 1938 non-fiction book written by Winston Churchill. It was later published in the United States as While England Slept; a Survey of World Affairs, 1932–1938. It highlighted the United Kingdom's lack of military preparation to face the threat of Nazi Germany's expansion and attacked the current policies of the British government, led by the Conservative Prime Minister Neville Chamberlain. The book galvanised many of his supporters and built up public opposition to the Munich Agreement.

John F. Kennedy was inspired by the book's title when he published his thesis, which he wrote during his senior year at Harvard College and in which he examined the reasons for Britain's lack of preparation. Originally titled Appeasement in Munich, it was titled Why England Slept upon its 1940 publication.
