= Viorel Tilea =

Romanian diplomat and politician (1896–1972)

Viorel Tilea CBE
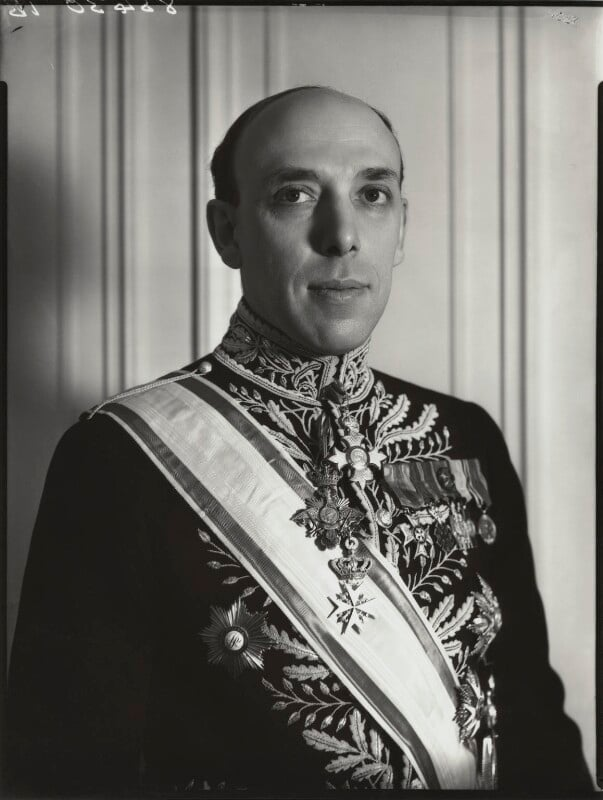
- Tilea in 1939
- Born: April 6, 1896; Sibiu, Austria-Hungary
- Died: August 20, 1972 (aged 76); London, United Kingdom
- Education: University of Vienna
- Occupation: Romanian diplomat
- Spouses: Eugenia Pop (m. 1921; died 1947) Manuela Monroe (m. 1951)
- Children: 6

Viorel Virgil Tilea CBE (6 April 1896 – 20 September 1972) was a Romanian diplomat, most noted for his ambassadorship in the United Kingdom before and during the Second World War. He died in London. During the Second World War, Tilea lived at Holton Place, Oxfordshire, where he became a key representative of Romania's monarchist regime in exile.

== Early life ==
He was born in Sibiu. He studied at the Hermannstädter Evangelisches Obergymnasium in Sibiu, before joining the University of Bratislava. However, in 1915, he was conscripted into the Austro-Hungarian Army. He completed his studies at the University of Vienna.

Tilea published two works, entitled Rolul diplomației în politica de stat ("The role of diplomacy in state policy") and Acțiunea diplomatică a României ("Romanian diplomatic action"), eventually translated into German, Hungarian, Croatian, and Bulgarian.

== Career ==
=== Early career ===
In October 1918, he joined the Romanian National Council, and was soon sent to Geneva, to meet Mr. Herron, an American writer, and friend of United States President Woodrow Wilson. Between February and October 1919, he served as the private secretary of Iuliu Maniu, and from October to December 1919 as the private secretary of Alexander Vaida, attending the Paris Peace Conference. It was in that year he became attached to the Romanian Legation in London.

He served as Extraordinary and Plenipotentiary Envoy of Romania to London between 1938 and 1940. He was the first to work in 1 Belgrave Square at the Romanian Embassy, the current home of the Romanian Cultural Institute.

=== Romanian war scare ===
In mid-March 1939, Tilea falsely reported to the British government that his country was under the verge of an immediate German attack, which led to a U-turn on British policy of resisting commitments of Eastern Europe, as part of the government's European policy, which became known as the "Romanian war scare". In fact, there was no German attack planned on Romania in March 1939.

However, the Romanian government, faced with troops from Romania's archenemy, Hungary, concentrating on the border, and German efforts to secure control of Romania's oil industry, had concluded that there was a danger of a Hungarian-German invasion and had exaggerated the danger level to secure British support. Whether Tilea was deliberately exaggerating the German threat to Romania as a way of gaining British support against the German demands to surrender the control of their oil industry, as claimed by the British historian D.C. Watt, or if the Romanians genuinely believed that they were about to be invaded by Germany in March 1939, as claimed by the American historian Gerhard Weinberg, is still unclear.

=== Second World War ===
In September 1940, a coalition of Horia Sima, leader of the Iron Guard, and General (later Marshal) Ion Antonescu had formed a National Legionary State in Romania, forcing King Carol II to abdicate in favour of his 19-year-old son Michael, who became a figurehead to the new fascist regime. During that period, Tilea was recalled from his post in the Romanian embassy in London, but he decided to stay in England, requesting political asylum. Resigning his post, he co-founded the Free Romanian Movement. In the meantime, Carol II fled to exile in Mexico, where he wrote to his second cousin George VI, hoping for British support for an overthrowing of the new government to return it to a monarchy. The British did not support that, however, and so Tilea would spend the war in planning the liberation of Romania by external means with the Allies. Tilea also played a role in assisting the efforts that the British government made to support monarchists in Romania.

== Personal life ==
In 1921, he married Eugenia "Gene" Pop in Cluj. After a short stay in London in February 1922, the two returned to Cluj. His first wife died in 1947; in 1951, he remarried, to Manuela Monroe.

He had three daughters, Ileana Troiano, Ioana Ellerington, and Stanca Lipton, and a son, Scotus Tilea, from his first marriage and a son, Ioni Tilea, and daughter, Anca Tilea, from his second marriage. He was made a Commander of the Order of the British Empire (C.B.E.).

== Bibliography ==
- Aster, Sidney, "Viorel Virgil Tilea and the Origins of the Second World War: An Essay in Closure", Diplomacy and Statecraft, 13 (September 2002), 153–74.
