= James P. Levy =

American historian (born 1965)

James P. Levy (born January 5, 1965) is an American historian whose published works have dealt with the Royal Navy in the 20th century and with Great Britain in the 1930s.

== Early life and education ==
James P. Levy was born in Brooklyn, New York, in 1965. He grew up in Hicksville, New York, where he attended Holy Trinity High School. Levy matriculated at Hofstra University, earning a B.A. degree in history. Later, he studied international political economy and international relations, receiving an MA in political science. His Ph.D. work was done under historian Michael Simpson at the University of Wales Swansea (now Swansea University). He has taught at the State University of New York at Farmingdale and at Hofstra University.

== Publications ==
Levy published his dissertation as The Royal Navy’s Home Fleet in World War II (Palgrave, 2003). He followed this with a more popular work discussing the last years of peace titled Appeasement and Rearmament: Britain, 1936–1939. Historian Andrew Gordon wrote of Appeasement and Rearmament that, given Britain’s strategic, political, and economic situation, diplomacy make both pragmatic and ethical sense in the late 1930s. James P. Levy’s succinct and beautifully written synthesis of the case for the tandem policies of appeasement and rearmament places them in their proper context and relationship. However, G.C. Peden was not impressed, while David French represented Appeasement and Rearmament as primarily a stimulating work for undergraduates. In addition, Levy has published articles in The Mariner’s Mirror, The Naval War College Review, Journal of Strategic Studies, War in History, and Global War Studies (see bibliography below).

== Themes ==
Levy’s work has centered on naval affairs in the period 1933–1945. His broad theme has been that the British Royal Navy handled this period of stress and change with admirable skill, but operated within an economic, industrial, and political climate largely unfavorable to the Royal Navy’s efforts to meet its strategic goals. Most controversial in this project has been Levy’s wariness (at times bordering on frustrated hostility) of the hagiography surrounding the person of Winston Spencer Churchill. This unease at what he seems to view as an overly reverential attitude on the part of historians towards Churchill is clearly manifested in Levy’s assessment of the career of Admiral of the Fleet Sir Charles Morton Forbes, who led the Home Fleet in 1939–40 while Churchill was First Lord of the Admiralty and then prime minister. More recently, Levy has begun analyzing the Royal Navy in relationship to its American and Japanese rivals. His latest article deals with the development of the Royal Navy’s Fleet Air Arm in the run-up to the Second World War. The evidence Levy uncovered in the archives points to a much more prolonged and serious engagement by the Royal Navy with the aircraft carrier and her embarked aircraft than has hitherto been understood or acknowledged by historians.

== Learned societies ==
James P. Levy was elected a Fellow of the Royal Historical Society in November 2006 and is also a member of the Society for Military History and the American Historical Association.

== Ideas about writing history ==
In his Home Fleet book, Levy wrote: The following operational history absolves no one. Nor does it have a grand thesis about war, or Britain, or the course of Empire. Reconstructing and evaluating what happened was hard enough. It is, however, tinged with respect, a respect the officers and men of the Home Fleet earned in a great global conflict for freedom. Later, in a book review that appeared in the Journal of Military History Levy opined: And why must so many of us [historians] tie our historical investigations to a thesis or theory? Is it not acceptable to describe the past, comment on what appears to have been happening as best as we can recreate it, and let it go at that? Must we have a thesis, and then drive ourselves crazy (or worse, fool ourselves to keep the thesis alive) in order to “prove” this or that proposition?
