= Richard Cockett =

British historian and journalist (born 1961)

Richard Cockett (born 1961) is a British historian, journalist and author.

He is a regional editor of The Economist, with experience in Mexico, Central America, Africa and Singapore, and was previously a senior lecturer in politics and history at Royal Holloway, University of London.

Richard Cockett is the main recipient of the 2024 Bruno-Kreisky-Prize.

== Works ==
- Thinking the Unthinkable: Think-tanks and the Economic Counter-revolution, 1931–1983. (HarperCollins, 1994). ISBN 978-0-00-223672-0.
- Twilight of Truth: Chamberlain, Appeasement, and the Manipulation of the Press (St. Martin's Press, 1989) ISBN 978-0-312-03140-4
- David Astor and The Observer (Andre Deutsch, 1990). ISBN 978-0-233-98735-4
- New Left, New Right and Beyond. Taking the Sixties Seriously (with Geoff Andrews, Alan Hooper, Michael Williams) (Palgrave Macmillan, 1999). ISBN 978-0-333-74147-4
- Sudan: Darfur and the failure of an African State. (Yale University Press, 2010). ISBN 978-0-300-16273-8
- Blood, Dreams and Gold: The Changing Face of Burma. (Yale University Press, 2015). ISBN 978-0-300-20451-3
- Vienna: How the City of Ideas Created the Modern World. (Yale University Press, 2023). ISBN 978-0-300-26653-5
