= A total and unmitigated defeat =

1938 speech by Winston Churchill

A Total and Unmitigated Defeat was a speech by Winston Churchill in the House of Commons at Westminster on Wednesday, 5 October 1938, the third day of the Munich Agreement debate. Signed five days earlier by Prime Minister Neville Chamberlain, the agreement met the demands of Nazi Germany with respect to the Czechoslovak region of Sudetenland.

Churchill spoke for 45 minutes to criticise the government for signing the agreement and, in general, for its policy of appeasement. He argued that Britain and France did not “save peace” by deterring aggression, but instead avoided immediate war by conceding to coercive demands and abandoning an ally.

Churchill had hoped for a reasonable settlement of the Sudetenland issue, but he was adamant that Britain must fight for the continued independence of Czechoslovakia. Among his other criticisms of the government, Churchill said that the Soviet Union should have been invited to take part in the negotiations with Hitler.

Although it was one of Churchill's most famous speeches, the Commons voted 366 to 144 in support of a motion in favour of the government's signing of the agreement. Despite their stated opposition to the agreement, Churchill and his Conservative Party supporters chose to abstain, and did not vote against the motion.

== Background ==
=== Churchill in 1938 ===
In 1938, Winston Churchill was a backbench MP who had been out of government office since 1929. He was the Conservative member for Epping. From the mid-1930s, alarmed by developments in Germany, he had consistently emphasised the necessity of rearmament and the buildup of national defences, especially the Royal Air Force. Churchill strongly opposed the appeasement of Hitler, a policy by which the British government, led by Prime Minister Neville Chamberlain, hoped to maintain peace in Europe.

=== Czechoslovakia and the Sudetenland ===
The First Czechoslovak Republic was created in 1918 as an amalgam of territories that had belonged to Austria-Hungary. Among its citizens were three million ethnic Germans, accounting for 22.95% of the total population. Most Germans lived in the Sudetenland, a region that bordered Germany and Austria. Sudetenland was the most industrialised area of Czechoslovakia and relied heavily on exports for regional prosperity. The economy of the region was badly hit by the Great Depression after the Wall Street crash of 1929. Unemployment escalated, especially among Sudeten Germans, and in 1933, inspired by Hitler's rise to power in Germany, Konrad Henlein founded the Sudeten German Party (SdP), which publicly asked for regional autonomy but secretly sought the union of Sudetenland with Germany.

Soon after the Anschluß, Germany's annexation of Austria in March 1938, Henlein met Hitler in Berlin and was instructed to present the so-called Karlsbader Programm to the Czechoslovak government, led by President Edvard Beneš. The document amounted to a series of demands that Czechoslovakia could not accept, principally autonomy for all Germans living in the country. Hitler and Goebbels launched a propaganda campaign in support of the SdP. As Hitler had intended, tensions rose until by September, the outbreak of war seemed immininent.

Czechoslovakia needed the support of other European powers, especially Britain and France. Writing in the Evening Standard on 18 March, Churchill called upon Chamberlain to declare with France that both countries would aid Czechoslovakia if it was subject to an unprovoked attack.

Chamberlain, however, had other ideas. He sympathised with the Sudeten Germans and, commenting on the French declaration, believed some arrangement should be made that "would prove more acceptable to Germany".

=== Escalation of crisis ===
Germany mobilised on 2 September, and the crisis came to a head on the 12th, when Hitler made a speech at Nuremberg in which he condemned the Czechoslovak government and accused it of atrocities and of denying rights of self-determination to the Sudeten Germans. On the 13th, Chamberlain decided to act and requested a meeting with Hitler to try to avert the possibility of war. Chamberlain met Hitler at Berchtesgaden on the 15th, but there was no conclusion. However, Hitler demanded for the Sudetenland to be ceded to Germany but claimed that he had no designs on the remainder of Czechoslovakia.

Chamberlain met French Prime Minister Édouard Daladier in London next day. They agreed that Czechoslovakia should cede to Germany all territories in which over 50% of the population were ethnic Germans. In exchange, Britain and France would guarantee the independence of Czechoslovakia. The Czechoslovaks rejected the proposal and the same day issued a warrant for Henlein's arrest.

Chamberlain met Hitler again from 22 to 24 September in Bad Godesberg. Hitler increased his demands, but Chamberlain objected. Hitler stated that Germany would occupy the Sudetenland on 1 October, but that had been planned as early as May, when the invasion plan, Fall Grün, was drafted. The French and the Czechoslovaks rejected Hitler's demands at Bad Godesberg.

Chamberlain, now anticipating the outbreak of war, said on 27 September 1938 in a radio address to the British people, "How incredible it is that we should be digging trenches and trying on gas-masks here because of a quarrel in a far-away country between people of whom we know nothing".

=== Munich Conference ===
On 28 September, Chamberlain sent a further appeal to Hitler and began a speech in the British House of Commons to try to explain the seriousness of the crisis. During his speech, he was handed a message from Hitler that invited him to Munich with Daladier and Mussolini. On the 29th, Mussolini officially proposed what became the Munich Agreement. The Czechoslovak representatives were excluded from the conference on Hitler's insistence and had to rely on Chamberlain and Daladier for information. The four leaders reached agreement on the 29th and signed the treaty at 01:30 the next day. Czechoslovakia reluctantly accepted the agreement as a fait accompli. It ceded the Sudetenland to Germany on 10 October, and Hitler agreed to take no action against the rest of the country.

Later that day, Hitler met Chamberlain privately. They signed the Anglo-German Agreement, which included a statement that both nations considered the Munich Agreement was "symbolic of the desire of our two peoples never to go to war again". Hitler afterwards dismissed the paper as insignificant, but Chamberlain made political capital out of it, returned to England and declared that it was "peace for our time".

=== "Lost the courage" ===
A debate on Munich began in the British House of Commons on 3 October. That day, a Conservative minister, Duff Cooper resigned in protest from his post as First Lord of the Admiralty. In his resignation speech on 3 October, Cooper said that Britain had "lost the courage to see things as they are" and that the country had been "drifting, day by day, nearer into war with Germany, and we have never said, until the last moment, and then in most uncertain terms, that we were prepared to fight".

On 4 October, the Manchester Guardian printed a letter from F. L. Lucas, a professor of literature at the University of Cambridge who had been a wounded veteran of World War I and would later work at Bletchley Park during World War II. His letter was headed "The Funeral of British Honour" and stated:

The flowers piled before 10, Downing Street are very fitting for the funeral of British honour and, it may be, of the British Empire. I appreciate the Prime Minister’s love of peace. I know the horrors of war – a great deal better than he can. But when he returns from saving our skins from a blackmailer at the price of other people’s flesh, and waves a piece of paper with Herr Hitler’s name on it, if it were not ghastly, it would be grotesque. No doubt he has never read Mein Kampf in German. But to forget, so utterly, the Reichstag fire, and the occupation of the Rhineland, and 30 June 1934, and the fall of Austria! We have lost the courage to see things as they are. And yet Herr Hitler has kindly put down for us in black and white that programme he is so faithfully carrying out.

=== Simon's motion ===
When the debate recommenced on 5 October, Chancellor of the Exchequer Sir John Simon raised a motion: "That this House approves the policy of His Majesty's Government by which war was averted in the recent crisis and supports their efforts to secure a lasting peace". A vote in favour of the motion would confirm the Commons' approval of the Munich Agreement, which ceded the Sudetenland from Czechoslovakia to Germany. In broader terms, support for Simon's motion would signal approval of the government's policy of appeasement in its dealings with Hitler.

After Simon's opening address, the Labour Party's deputy leader, Arthur Greenwood, replied for the Opposition. He pointed out that "the eleventh-hour concessions made at Munich went far beyond the Anglo-French Memorandum and represented a further retreat by Britain and France from the admittedly outrageous demands already made upon Czechoslovakia". Greenwood challenged the right of the "Four-Power Pact", which operated at Munich, to make binding decisions on world affairs within which, he reminded, the Soviet Union and the United States were powerful factors. Greenwood completed his speech and was followed by Churchill.

== Speech ==
Roy Jenkins stated that Churchill delivered "a speech of power and intransigence". Having shortly disclaimed any personal animosity towards Chamberlain, Churchill declared:

I will, therefore, begin by saying the most unpopular and most unwelcome thing. I will begin by saying what everybody would like to ignore or forget but which must nevertheless be stated, namely, that we have sustained a total and unmitigated defeat, and that France has suffered even more than we have.

Having dealt with an interruption by Nancy Astor, who accused him of talking "nonsense", Churchill focused on Chamberlain and said:

The utmost he has been able to gain for Czechoslovakia and in the matters which were in dispute has been that the German dictator, instead of snatching his victuals from the table, has been content to have them served to him course by course.

He summarized the positions reached at Berchtesgaden, Bad Godesberg and Munich metaphorically:

£1 was demanded at the pistol's point. When it was given, £2 were demanded at the pistol's point. Finally, the dictator consented to take £1 17s. 6d and the rest in promises of goodwill for the future.

Churchill refuted the idea that "peace" had been achieved at Munich by suggesting that so long as Britain was prepared to capitulate, then war was not likely to begin with:

There never can be any absolute certainty that there will be a fight if one side is determined that it will give way completely.

Churchill then argued that the Czechoslovak government, left to itself and knowing that it would get no help from the Western Powers, would have made better terms. Later in the speech, Churchill predicted accurately that the rest of Czechoslovakia would be "engulfed in the Nazi regime". He went on to say that in his view, "the maintenance of peace depends upon the accumulation of deterrents against the aggressor, coupled with a sincere effort to redress grievances". He argued that that course had not been taken because Britain and France did not involve "other powers", which could have guaranteed the security of Czechoslovakia while the Sudetenland issue was being examined by an international body. The other power that he had in mind was the Soviet Union, and Churchill soon remonstrated that close contact with it should have been made during the summer months, while the crisis unfolded. Churchill maintained that Hitler would not have followed his course if the Soviets had been involved in the summit meetings.

Churchill indicted the British government for the neglect of its responsibilities in the past five years since Hitler had come to power: "Thou art weighed in the balance and found wanting". He compared the Chamberlain regime with the court of Ethelred the Unready and reminded how England, having held a position of real strength under Alfred the Great, later "fell very swiftly into chaos".

Churchill concluded with a dire warning that foreshadowed the outbreak of the Second World War eleven months later:

And do not suppose that this is the end. This is only the beginning of the reckoning. This is only the first sip, the first foretaste of a bitter cup which will be proffered to us year by year unless by a supreme recovery of moral health and martial vigour, we arise again and take our stand for freedom as in the olden time.

Although the speech is regarded as one of Churchill's finest, it was spoken when he was still a minority politician and, as Jenkins noted, unable to win many friends on the Conservative benches. On 6 October, the Commons concluded the debate and voted 366 to 144 in support of Simon's motion to approve Chamberlain's signing of the Munich Agreement.

No Conservative Party member voted against the motion, and even Churchill and his supporters only abstained.

== Aftermath ==
Churchill's speech had little immediate effect on British public opinion. He himself faced retribution from Conservatives in his constituency and needed a vote of confidence to retain his seat at a meeting of his constituents on 4 November. He won with 100 votes to 44, largely thanks to the support of Sir James Hawkey, who was the chairman of the Epping Conservative Association.

Most people clung to the hope of a lasting peace as promised by Chamberlain. It was not until the Kristallnacht, the anti-Jewish violence of 9–10 November 1938, that they began to think otherwise. It became increasingly difficult for Chamberlain to portray Hitler as a partner in peace. The British government then embarked on a programme of rearmament that was unprecedented in peacetime. The French did likewise.

On 15 March 1939, Germany and Hungary overran the rest of Czechoslovakia, just as Churchill had predicted five months earlier. The Slovak part of the country became nominally independent as the First Slovak Republic but was only a German puppet state. The Czech lands became a puppet state incorporated into Greater Germany as the Protectorate of Bohemia and Moravia.

After Chamberlain had declared war against Germany on 3 September 1939, one of his first actions was to restore Churchill to government office. Churchill was reappointed First Lord of the Admiralty, the office that he held in 1914 at the beginning of the First World War. On 10 May 1940, he succeeded Chamberlain, who had resigned as Prime Minister.

== Bibliography ==
=== Speech ===
- Churchill, Winston (1938). "The Munich Agreement". Washington, DC: International Churchill Society. This page provides the full text of Churchill's speech as recorded in Hansard.

=== Books ===
- Faber, David (2008). Munich: The 1938 Appeasement Crisis. New York City: Simon & Schuster. ISBN 978-18-47390-06-6.
- Gilbert, Martin (1991). Churchill: A Life. London: Heinemann. ISBN 978-04-34291-83-0.
- Jenkins, Roy (2001). Churchill. London: Macmillan Press. ISBN 978-03-30488-05-1.
- Marr, Andrew (2009). The Making of Modern Britain. London: Macmillan. ISBN 978-03-30510-99-8.
- Self, Robert (2006). Neville Chamberlain: A Biography. Farnham: Ashgate Publishing. ISBN 978-07-54656-15-9.
- Thomson, David (1978). Europe Since Napoleon. London: Penguin Books. ISBN 978-01-40135-61-9.
