= Why England Slept =

Book by John F. Kennedy

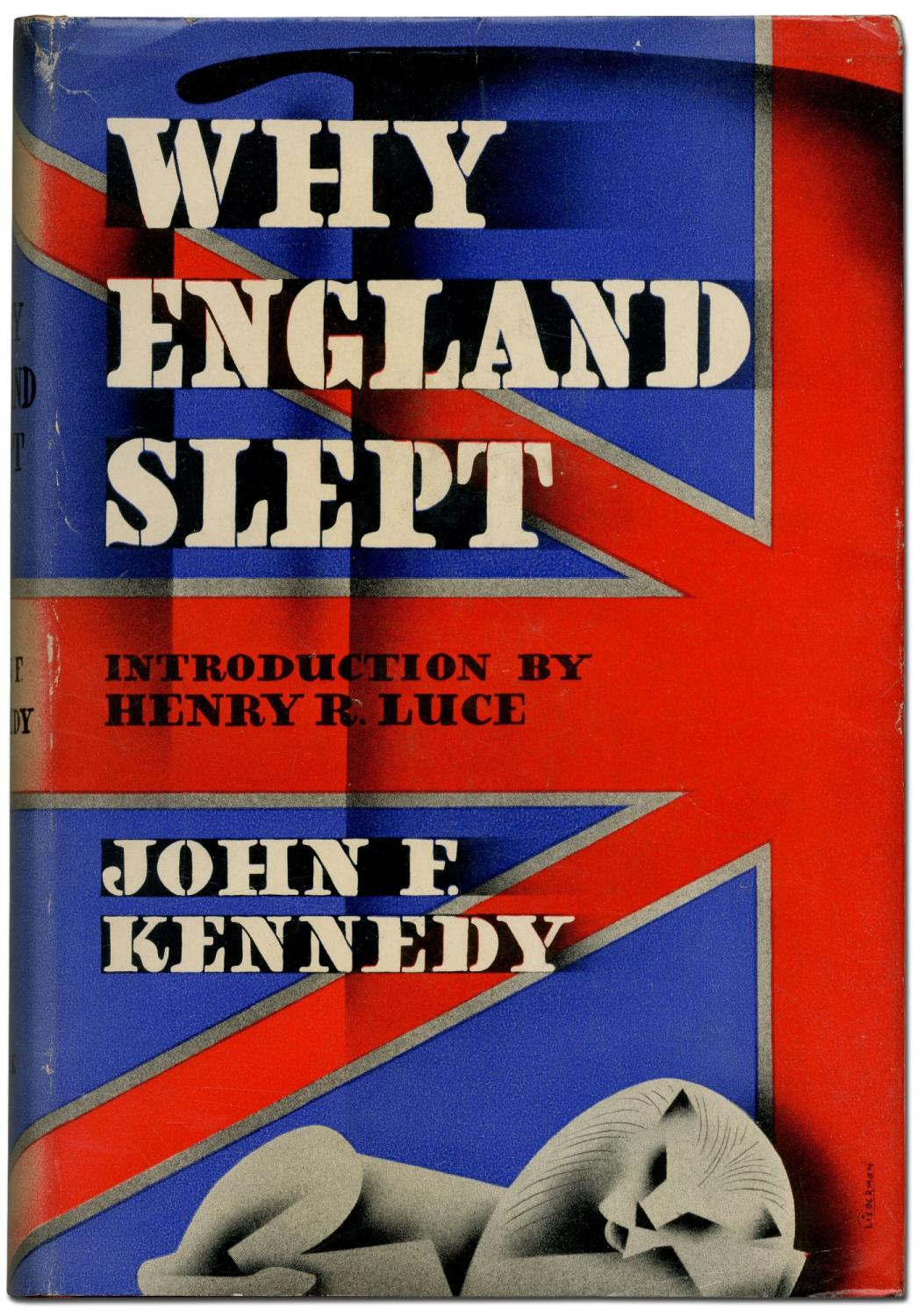
- First edition
- Author: John F. Kennedy
- Language: English
- Subject: Buildup of Nazi German power and appeasement of Nazi Germany by the United Kingdom
- Genre: Thesis
- Publisher: Wilfred Funk
- Publication date: 1940
- Publication place: New York
- Pages: 256
- ISBN: 9780313228742
- Dewey Decimal: 941.083
- LC Class: DA578 .K4
- Followed by: Profiles in Courage

Why England Slept (1940) is the published version of a thesis written by John F. Kennedy in his senior year at Harvard College. Its title alludes to Winston Churchill's 1938 book Arms and the Covenant, published in the United States as While England Slept, which also examined the buildup of German power. Kennedy's book examines the failures of the British government to take steps to prevent World War II and its initial lack of response to Adolf Hitler's threats of war.

Rather than castigating the popular appeasement policy that the British government then pursued, it is notable for taking the uncommon stance that if Great Britain had confronted Nazi Germany earlier it would have been far more disastrous for her than the delay caused by the appeasement policies of Chamberlain and other British leaders.

== Publication ==
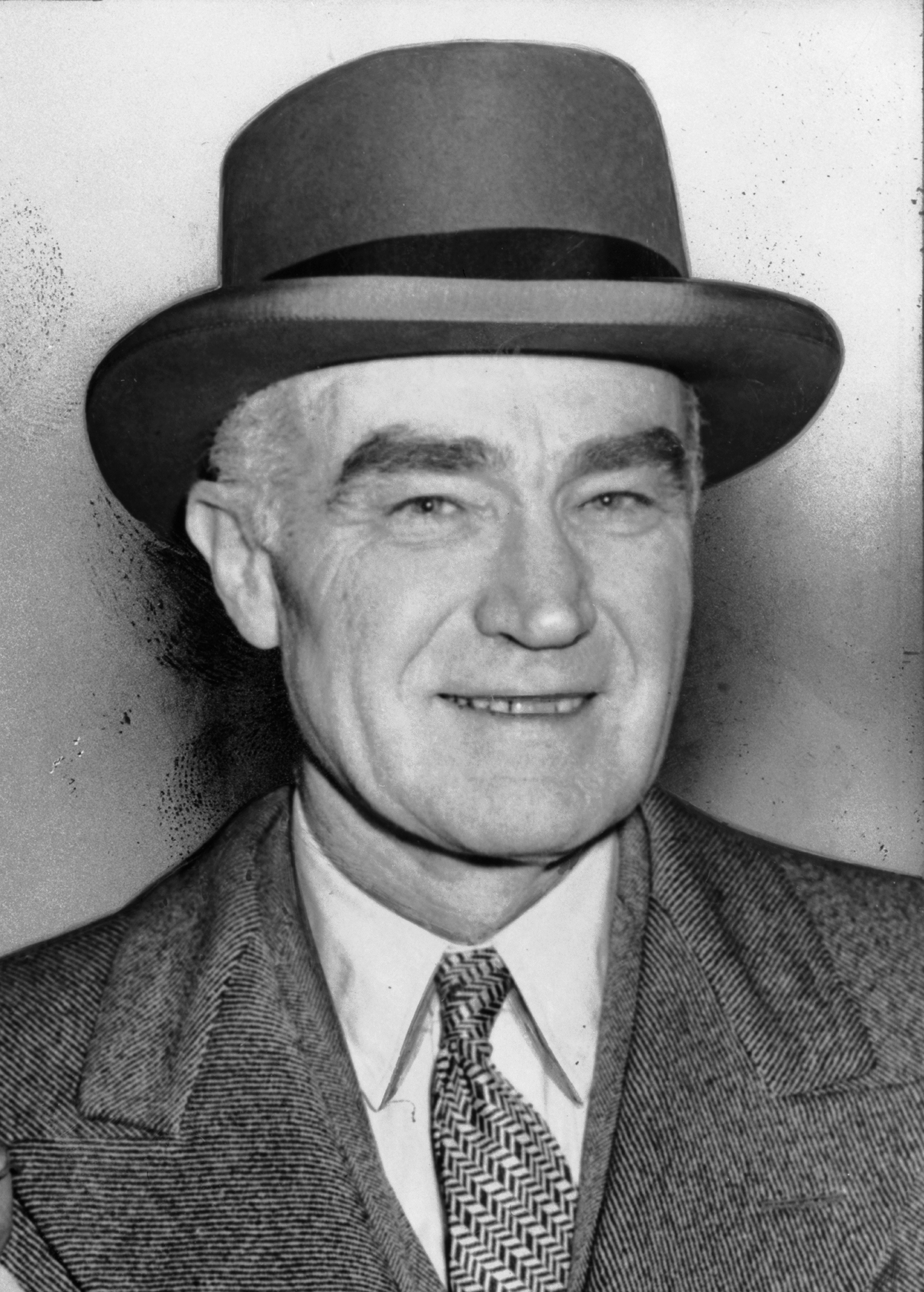
Influential publishing magnate Henry Luce wrote the foreword

The book was originally intended to be no more than a college thesis. It was rated magna cum laude by professor Henry A. Yeomans and cum laude plus by professor Carl J. Friedrich. However, Kennedy's father, Joseph P. Kennedy Sr., keen to elevate his son's reputation, encouraged Kennedy to convert the thesis into book form and publish it. He then enlisted the highly influential publishing magnate Henry Luce to write the foreword, and his friend Arthur Krock, former bureau chief of The New York Times, to assist in redrafting the thesis, which had originally been titled "Appeasement At Munich."

The historian Garry Wills claimed that the assistance amounted to rewriting and retitling the manuscript and finding an agent for its publication. As United States ambassador to the United Kingdom, Kennedy Sr. supported British Prime Minister Neville Chamberlain's policy of appeasement during the late 1930s. His stance furthering appeasement would eventually cause Kennedy Sr.'s removal as ambassador to the United Kingdom, and prove disastrous for his future political aspirations. By contrast, John F. Kennedy broke with his father's support for appeasement, and was moved when he witnessed firsthand the Luftwaffe's bombings of Britain.

== Reception ==
After it was published in 1940, the book sold 80,000 copies in the United Kingdom and the United States and collected $40,000 in royalties for Kennedy. Income from the British sales were donated to Plymouth, a British city that had recently been bombed by the Luftwaffe. Kennedy bought a Buick convertible with the income from the book's North American sales.

== Analysis ==
The book addressed Kennedy's belief in the need for objective and detached calculation in foreign policy decisions. Kennedy historian and foreign relations professor Fredrik Logevall believed the book demonstrates Kennedy's "commitment to an unsentimental realism in international affairs". Kennedy is telling future policy makers that "foreign threats cannot be dealt with by ignoring them or wishing them away ... they must be confronted by clearheaded and informed calculation".
