= Peace for our time =

Phrase used by Neville Chamberlain

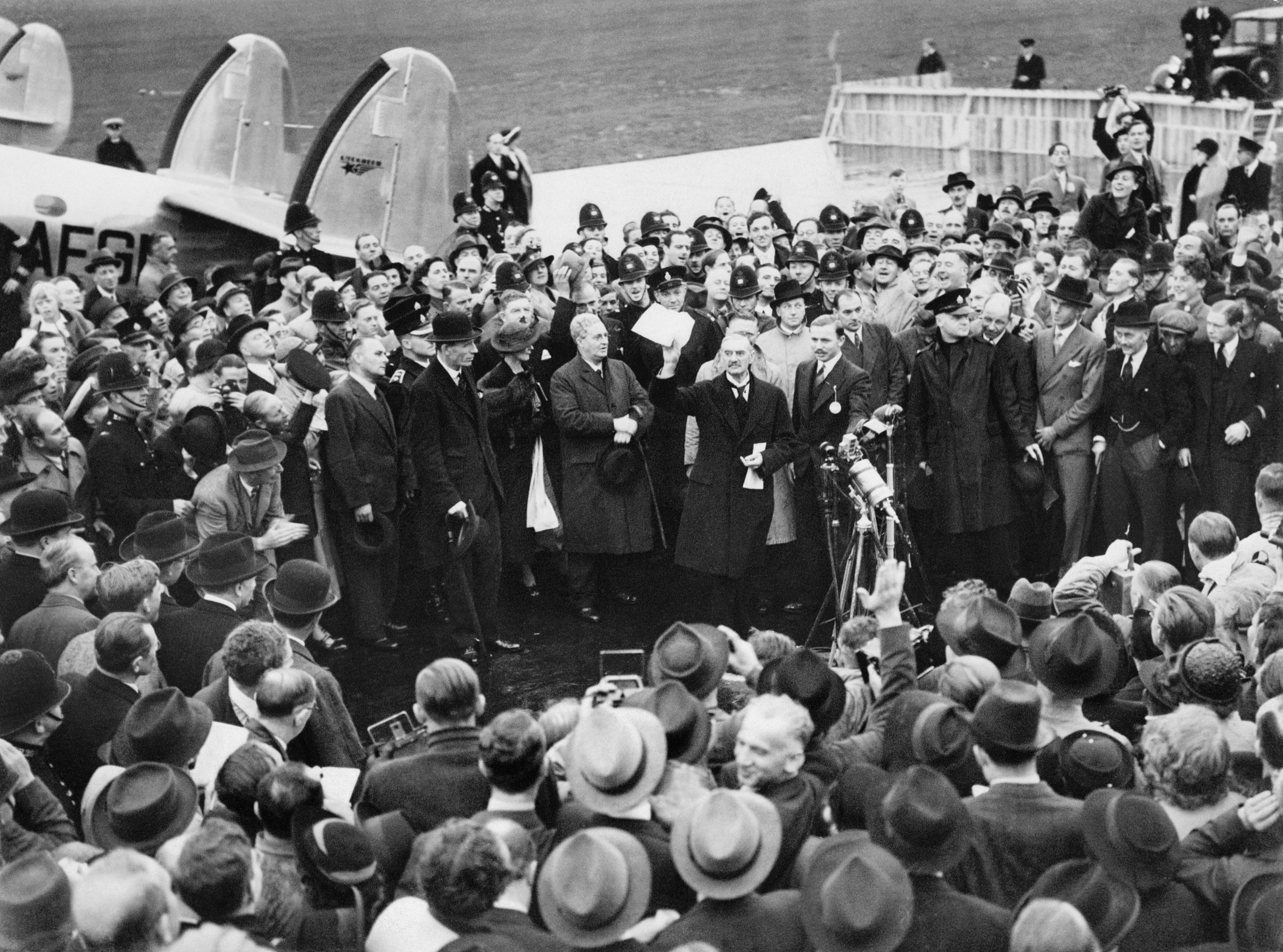
Neville Chamberlain showing the Anglo-German Declaration (the resolution) to commit to peaceful methods signed by both Hitler and himself, at Heston Aerodrome, on his return from Munich on 30 September 1938

Chamberlain's return to the UK after Munich
Neville Chamberlain speaks to the crowd upon arrival at Heston Aerodrome, 30 September 1938.

"Peace for our time" was a declaration made by British Prime Minister Neville Chamberlain in his 30 September 1938 remarks in London concerning the Munich Agreement and the subsequent Anglo-German Declaration. The phrase echoed Benjamin Disraeli, who, upon returning from the Congress of Berlin in 1878, had stated, "Lord Salisbury and myself have brought you back peace — but a peace I hope with honour." The phrase is primarily remembered for its bitter ironic value since less than a year after the agreement, Germany's invasion of Poland began World War II.

It is often misquoted as "peace in our time", a phrase already familiar to the British public from its longstanding appearance in the Book of Common Prayer. A passage in that book translated from the 7th-century hymn "Da pacem Domine" reads, "Give peace in our time, O Lord; because there is none other that fighteth for us, but only thou, O God."

== Speeches ==
Chamberlain's aeroplane landed at Heston Aerodrome on 30 September 1938 and he spoke to the spectators there:

The settlement of the Czechoslovak problem which has now been achieved is, in my view, only the prelude to a larger settlement in which all Europe may find peace. This morning I had another talk with the German Chancellor, Herr Hitler, and here is a paper which bears his name upon it as well as mine. Some of you perhaps have already heard what it contains, but I would just like to read it to you. " ... We regard the agreement signed last night and the Anglo-German Naval Agreement as symbolic of the desire of our two peoples never to go to war with one another again".

Later that day, he stood outside 10 Downing Street, again read from the document and concluded:

My good friends, this is the second time in our history that there has come back from Germany to Downing Street peace with honour.

I believe it is peace for our time...

We thank you from the bottom of our hearts. Now I recommend you go home and sleep quietly in your beds.

Chamberlain's return was not universally well-received, and 15,000 people protested against the Munich Agreement the same day in Trafalgar Square, three times more than the number welcoming him at 10 Downing Street. Chamberlain's ongoing manipulation of the BBC caused that news to be largely suppressed. The Labour spokesman Hugh Dalton publicly suggested that the piece of paper that Chamberlain was waving was "torn from the pages of Mein Kampf."

As a backbench Member of Parliament who opposed appeasement, Winston Churchill fiercely condemned the deal, warning that sacrificing a small nation to a dictator would not prevent war, only postpone it on much worse terms. He is famously attributed with the quote, "You were given the choice between war and dishonour. You chose dishonour, and you will have war," directed at Prime Minister Neville Chamberlain following the 1938 Munich Agreement. While historians like Richard M. Langworth note that there is no direct contemporary record of Churchill uttering or writing those exact words verbatim to Chamberlain or in Parliament, it accurately captures his sentiment. For instance, in a letter to Lord Moyne on September 11, 1938, Churchill wrote: "We seem to be very near the bleak choice between War and Shame. My feeling is that we shall choose Shame, and then have War thrown in a little later on even more adverse terms than at present."

Disbelieving Chamberlain, Isaac Asimov published in July 1939 "Trends", which mentions a world war in 1940. He later wrote "I was too conservative" (about when war would begin).

== Cultural references ==
Peace in Our Time is the title of a 1947 stage play by Noël Coward, set in an alternate 1940. The Battle of Britain has been lost, the Germans have air supremacy, and the United Kingdom is under Nazi occupation. Inspired to write this play in 1946 after seeing the effects of the occupation of France, Coward wrote: "I began to suspect the physical effect of four years' intermittent bombing is far less damaging to the intrinsic character of a nation than the spiritual effect of four years of enemy occupation".

U.S. President John F. Kennedy alluded to the speech in his 1963 American University commencement address in which he stated that he sought "not merely peace in our time, but peace in all time."

In Avengers: Age of Ultron, Tony Stark uses the phrase as "Peace in our time" for his justification in creating the Artificial Intelligence Ultron, envisioning it as "a suit of armor around the world". This is a direct reference as in the movie it also completely backfires, as Ultron immediately concludes that the only path to true "peace" is the extermination of the human race.

== See also ==
- A total and unmitigated defeat
- Appeasement
- Dewey Defeats Truman
- European foreign policy of the Chamberlain ministry
- Mission Accomplished speech
- Political gaffe
- Western betrayal
