= Neville Chamberlain =

Prime Minister of the United Kingdom from 1937 to 1940

The Right Honourable Neville Chamberlain FRS
- Chamberlain in 1936

Prime Minister of the United Kingdom
- In office 28 May 1937 – 10 May 1940
- Monarch: George VI
- Preceded by: Stanley Baldwin
- Succeeded by: Winston Churchill

Leader of the Conservative Party
- In office 27 May 1937 – 9 October 1940
- Chairman: Douglas Hacking
- Preceded by: Stanley Baldwin
- Succeeded by: Winston Churchill
Ministerial offices
Lord President of the Council
In office 10 May 1940 – 3 October 1940
Prime Minister	Winston Churchill
Preceded by	The Earl Stanhope
Succeeded by	John Anderson
Chancellor of the Exchequer
In office 5 November 1931 – 28 May 1937
Prime Minister	Ramsay MacDonald; Stanley Baldwin
Preceded by	Philip Snowden
Succeeded by	John Simon
In office 27 August 1923 – 22 January 1924
Prime Minister	Stanley Baldwin
Preceded by	Stanley Baldwin
Succeeded by	Philip Snowden
Minister of Health
In office 25 August 1931 – 5 November 1931
Prime Minister	Ramsay MacDonald
Preceded by	Arthur Greenwood
Succeeded by	Hilton Young
In office 6 November 1924 – 4 June 1929
Prime Minister	Stanley Baldwin
Preceded by	John Wheatley
Succeeded by	Arthur Greenwood
In office 7 March 1923 – 27 August 1923
Prime Minister	Bonar Law; Stanley Baldwin
Preceded by	Arthur Griffith-Boscawen
Succeeded by	William Joynson-Hicks
Paymaster General
In office 5 February 1923 – 15 March 1923
Prime Minister	Bonar Law
Preceded by	Tudor Walters
Succeeded by	William Joynson-Hicks
Postmaster General
In office 31 October 1922 – 12 March 1923
Prime Minister	Bonar Law
Preceded by	Frederick Kellaway
Succeeded by	William Joynson-Hicks

Member of Parliament
- In office 14 December 1918 – 9 November 1940
- Preceded by: Constituency established
- Succeeded by: Peter Bennett
- Constituency: Birmingham Ladywood (1918–1929); Birmingham Edgbaston (1929–1940)

Personal details
- Born: Arthur Neville Chamberlain; 18 March 1869 Birmingham, England
- Died: 9 November 1940 (aged 71) Heckfield, England
- Resting place: Westminster Abbey
- Party: Conservative
- Other political affiliations: Liberal Unionist Party
- Spouse: Anne de Vere Cole (m. 1911)
- Children: 2
- Parents: Joseph Chamberlain (father); Florence Kenrick (mother)
- Education: Mason College
- Occupation: Businessman; politician
- Neville Chamberlain's voice Chamberlain declaring war on Germany; Recorded 3 September 1939

Arthur Neville Chamberlain (/ˈtʃeɪmbərlɪn/; 18 March 1869 – 9 November 1940) was Prime Minister of the United Kingdom from May 1937 to May 1940 and Leader of the Conservative Party from May 1937 to October 1940. He is known for his foreign policy of appeasement, and in particular for his signing of the Munich Agreement on 30 September 1938, ceding the German-speaking Sudetenland region of Czechoslovakia to Nazi Germany led by Adolf Hitler. Following the invasion of Poland on 1 September 1939, which marked the beginning of the Second World War, Chamberlain announced the declaration of war on Germany two days later and led the United Kingdom through the first eight months of the war until his resignation as prime minister on 10 May 1940.

After working in business and local government, and after a short spell as Director of National Service in 1916 and 1917, Chamberlain followed his father Joseph Chamberlain and elder half-brother Austen Chamberlain in becoming a member of Parliament at the 1918 general election for the new Birmingham Ladywood division at the age of 49. He declined a junior ministerial position, remaining a backbencher until 1922. He was rapidly promoted in 1923 to Minister of Health and then Chancellor of the Exchequer. After a short-lived Labour-led government, he returned as Minister of Health, introducing a range of reform measures from 1924 to 1929. He was appointed Chancellor of the Exchequer in the National Government in 1931.

Chamberlain succeeded Stanley Baldwin as prime minister on 28 May 1937. His premiership was dominated by the question of policy towards an increasingly aggressive Germany, and his actions at Munich were widely popular among the British at the time. In response to Hitler's continued aggression, Chamberlain pledged the United Kingdom to defend Poland's independence if the latter were attacked, an alliance that brought his country into declaring war on Germany after it invaded Poland, which resulted in the "Phoney War", but not in any substantial assistance to Poland's fight against the aggression. The failure of Allied forces to prevent the German invasion of Norway caused the House of Commons to hold the Norway Debate in May 1940. Chamberlain's conduct of the war was heavily criticised by members of all parties and, in a vote of confidence, his government's majority was greatly reduced. Accepting that a national government supported by all the main parties was essential, Chamberlain resigned the premiership because the Labour and Liberal parties would not serve under his leadership. Although he still led the Conservative Party, he was succeeded as prime minister by his colleague Winston Churchill. Until ill health forced him to resign on 22 September 1940, Chamberlain was an important member of the war cabinet as Lord President of the Council, heading the government in Churchill's absence. His support for Churchill proved vital during the May 1940 war cabinet crisis. Chamberlain died aged 71 on 9 November of cancer, six months after leaving the premiership.

Chamberlain's reputation remains controversial among historians, the initial high regard for him being entirely eroded by books such as Guilty Men, published in July 1940, which blamed Chamberlain and his associates for the Munich accord and for allegedly failing to prepare the country for war. Most historians in the generation following Chamberlain's death held similar views, led by Churchill in The Gathering Storm. Some later historians have taken a more favourable perspective of Chamberlain and his policies, citing government papers released under the thirty-year rule and arguing that going to war with Germany in 1938 would have been disastrous as the UK was unprepared. Nonetheless, Chamberlain is still unfavourably ranked amongst British prime ministers.

== Early life and political career (1869–1918) ==
=== Childhood and businessman ===
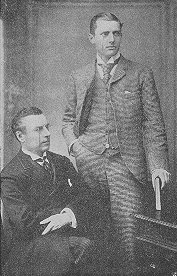
Joseph Chamberlain (seated) and Austen Chamberlain, 1892

Arthur Neville Chamberlain was born on 18 March 1869 at a house called Southbourne in the Edgbaston district of Birmingham. He was the only son of the second marriage of Joseph Chamberlain, who later became Mayor of Birmingham and a Cabinet minister. His mother was Florence Kenrick, a cousin of William Kenrick MP; she died when he was a small boy. Joseph Chamberlain had had another son, Austen Chamberlain, by his first marriage. The Chamberlain family were Unitarian, though Joseph lost personal religious faith by the time Neville was six years old and never required religious adherence of his children. Neville, who disliked attending worship services of any kind and showed no interest in organised religion, described himself as a Unitarian with no stated faith and also a "reverent agnostic".

Neville Chamberlain was educated at home by his elder sister Beatrice Chamberlain and later at Rugby School. Joseph Chamberlain then sent Neville to Mason College, now the University of Birmingham. Neville Chamberlain had little interest in his studies there, and in 1889 his father apprenticed him to a firm of accountants. Within six months he became a salaried employee. In an effort to recoup diminished family fortunes, Joseph Chamberlain sent his younger son to establish a sisal plantation on Andros Island in the Bahamas. Neville Chamberlain spent six years there but the plantation was a failure, and Joseph Chamberlain lost £50,000 (Note: Joseph Chamberlain's loss is equivalent to £29.1 million if measured as per capita gross domestic product; £4.2 million if measured as an RPI equivalent. See MeasuringWorth.) (equivalent to £5,684,000 in 2025).

On his return to England, Neville Chamberlain entered business, purchasing (with assistance from his family) Hoskins & Company, a manufacturer of metal ship berths. Chamberlain served as managing director of Hoskins for 17 years during which time the company prospered. He also involved himself in civic activities in Birmingham. In 1906, as Governor of Birmingham General Hospital, and along with "no more than fifteen" other dignitaries, Chamberlain became a founding member of the national United Hospitals Committee of the British Medical Association.

At forty, Chamberlain was expecting to remain a bachelor, but in 1910 he fell in love with Anne Cole, a recent connection by marriage, and married her the following year. They met through his Aunt Lilian, the Canadian-born widow of Joseph Chamberlain's brother Herbert, who in 1907 had married Anne Cole's uncle Alfred Clayton Cole, a director of the Bank of England.

She encouraged and supported his entry into local politics and was to be his constant companion, helper, and trusted colleague, fully sharing his interests in housing and other political and social activities after his election as an MP. The couple had a son and a daughter.

=== Entry into politics ===
Chamberlain initially showed little interest in politics, though his father and half-brother were in Parliament. During the "Khaki election" of 1900 he made speeches in support of Joseph Chamberlain's Liberal Unionists. The Liberal Unionists were allied with the Conservatives and later merged with them under the name "Unionist Party", which in 1925 became known as the "Conservative and Unionist Party". In 1911, Neville Chamberlain successfully stood as a Liberal Unionist for Birmingham City Council for the All Saints' Ward, located within his father's parliamentary constituency.

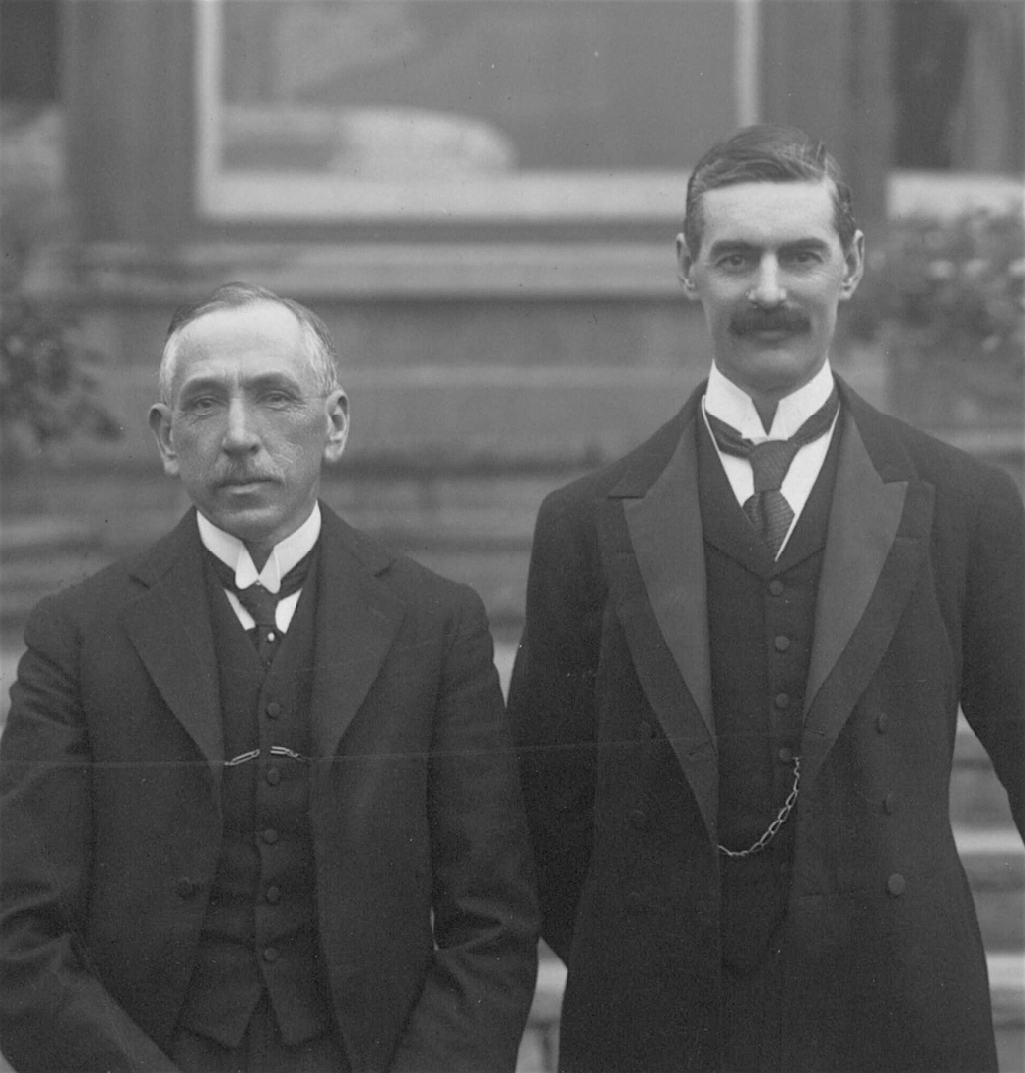
Chamberlain (right) as Lord Mayor of Birmingham in May 1916, alongside Prime Minister Billy Hughes of Australia

Chamberlain was made chairman of the Town Planning Committee. Under his direction, Birmingham soon adopted one of the first town planning schemes in Britain. The start of the First World War in 1914 prevented implementation of his plans. In 1915, Chamberlain became Lord Mayor of Birmingham. Apart from his father Joseph, five of Chamberlain's uncles had also attained the chief Birmingham civic dignity: they were Joseph's brother Richard Chamberlain, William and George Kenrick, Charles Beale, who had been four times Lord Mayor, and Thomas Martineau. As a lord mayor in wartime, Chamberlain had a huge burden of work and he insisted that his councillors and officials work equally hard. He halved the lord mayor's expense allowance and cut back on the number of civic functions expected of the incumbent. In 1915, Chamberlain was appointed a member of the Central Control Board on liquor traffic.

In December 1916, Prime Minister David Lloyd George offered Chamberlain the new position of Director of National Service, with responsibility for co-ordinating conscription and ensuring that essential war industries were able to function with sufficient workforces. His tenure was marked by conflict with Lloyd George; in August 1917, having received little support from the Prime Minister, Chamberlain resigned. The relationship between Chamberlain and Lloyd George would, thereafter, be one of mutual hatred.

Chamberlain decided to stand for the House of Commons, and was adopted as Unionist candidate for Birmingham Ladywood. After the war ended, a general election was called almost immediately. The campaign in this constituency was notable because his Liberal Party opponent was Margery Corbett Ashby, one of the seventeen women who stood for Parliament at the first election at which women were eligible to do so. Chamberlain reacted to Ashby's candidacy by being one of the few male candidates to specifically target women voters deploying his wife, issuing a special leaflet headed "A word to the Ladies" and holding two meetings in the afternoon. Chamberlain was elected with almost 70% of the vote and a majority of 6,833. He was 49 years old, which was at the time the greatest age at which any future prime minister had first been elected to the Commons.

== MP and minister (1919–1931) ==
=== Rise from the backbench ===
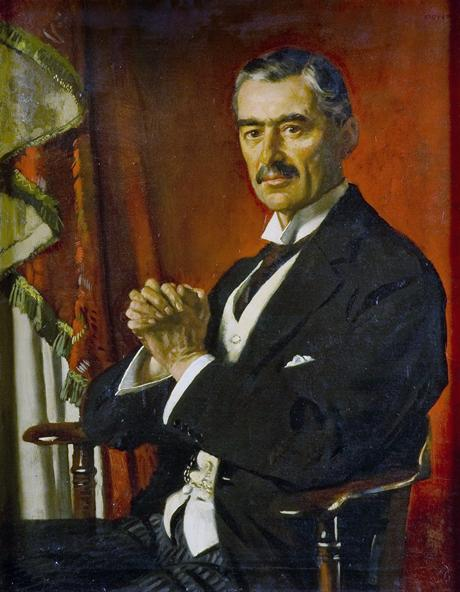
Portrait by William Orpen, 1929

Chamberlain threw himself into parliamentary work, begrudging the times when he was unable to attend debates and spending much time on committee work. He was chairman of the national Unhealthy Areas Committee (1919–21) and in that role, had visited the slums of London, Birmingham, Leeds, Liverpool and Cardiff. Consequently, in March 1920, Bonar Law offered him a junior post at the Ministry of Health on behalf of the Prime Minister, but Chamberlain was unwilling to serve under Lloyd George and was offered no further posts during Lloyd George's premiership. When Law resigned as party leader, Austen Chamberlain took his place as head of the Unionists in Parliament. Unionist leaders were willing to fight the 1922 election in coalition with the Lloyd George National Liberals, but on 19 October, Unionist MPs held a meeting at which they voted to fight the election as a single party. Lloyd George resigned, as did Austen Chamberlain, and Law was recalled from retirement to lead the Unionists as prime minister.

Many high-ranking Unionists refused to serve under Law to the benefit of Chamberlain, who rose over the course of ten months from backbencher to Chancellor of the Exchequer. Law initially appointed Chamberlain Postmaster General and Chamberlain was sworn of the Privy Council. When Arthur Griffith-Boscawen, the Minister of Health, lost his seat in the 1922 election and was defeated in a by-election in March 1923 by future home secretary James Chuter Ede, Law offered the position to Chamberlain. Two months later, Law was diagnosed with advanced, terminal throat cancer. He immediately resigned and was replaced by Chancellor of the Exchequer Stanley Baldwin. In August 1923, Baldwin promoted Chamberlain to the position of Chancellor of the Exchequer.

Chamberlain served only five months in the office before the Conservatives were defeated at the 1923 general election. Ramsay MacDonald became the first-ever Labour prime minister, but his government fell within months, necessitating another general election. By a margin of only 77 votes, Chamberlain narrowly defeated the Labour candidate, Oswald Mosley, who later led the British Union of Fascists. Believing he would lose if he stood again in Birmingham Ladywood, Chamberlain arranged to be adopted for Birmingham Edgbaston, the district of the city where he was born and which was a much safer seat, which he would hold for the rest of his life. The Unionists won the election, but Chamberlain declined to serve again as chancellor, preferring his former position as Minister of Health.

Within two weeks of his appointment as Minister of Health, Chamberlain presented the Cabinet with an agenda containing 25 pieces of legislation he hoped to see enacted. Before he left office in 1929, 21 of the 25 bills had passed into law. Chamberlain sought the abolition of the elected Poor Law Boards of Guardians which administered relief—and which in some areas were responsible for rates. Many of the boards were controlled by Labour, and such boards had defied the government by distributing relief funds to the able-bodied unemployed. In 1929 Chamberlain initiated the Local Government Act 1929 to abolish the Poor Law boards entirely. Chamberlain spoke in the Commons for two and a half hours on the second reading of the bill, and when he concluded he was applauded by all parties. The bill was passed into law.

Though Chamberlain struck a conciliatory note during the 1926 General Strike, in general he had poor relations with the Labour opposition. The future Labour prime minister Clement Attlee complained that Chamberlain "always treated us like dirt", and in April 1927 Chamberlain wrote "More and more do I feel an utter contempt for their lamentable stupidity." His poor relations with the Labour Party later played a major part in his downfall as prime minister.

== Chancellor of the Exchequer (1931–1937) ==
Baldwin called a general election for 30 May 1929, resulting in a hung parliament with Labour holding the most seats. Baldwin and his government resigned and Labour, under MacDonald, again took office. In 1931, the MacDonald government faced a serious crisis as the May Report revealed that the budget was unbalanced, with an expected shortfall of £120 million. The Labour government resigned on 24 August, and MacDonald formed a National Government supported by most Conservative MPs. Chamberlain once again returned to the Ministry of Health.

After the 1931 general election, in which supporters of the National Government (mostly Conservatives) won an overwhelming victory, MacDonald designated Chamberlain as Chancellor of the Exchequer. Chamberlain proposed a 10% tariff on foreign goods and lower or no tariffs on goods from the colonies and the Dominions. Joseph Chamberlain had advocated a similar policy, "Imperial Preference"; Neville Chamberlain laid his bill before the House of Commons on 4 February 1932, and concluded his address by noting the appropriateness of his seeking to enact his father's proposal. At the end of the speech, Austen Chamberlain walked down from the backbenches and shook his brother's hand. The Import Duties Act 1932 passed Parliament easily.

Chamberlain presented his first budget in April 1932. He maintained the severe budget cuts that had been agreed at the inception of the National Government. Interest on the war debt was a major cost. Chamberlain reduced the annual interest rate on most of Britain's war debt from 5% to 3.5%. Between 1932 and 1938, Chamberlain halved the percentage of the budget devoted to interest on the war debt.

=== War debt ===
Chamberlain hoped that a cancellation of the war debt owed to the United States could be negotiated. In June 1933, Britain hosted the World Monetary and Economic Conference, which came to nothing as US president Franklin D. Roosevelt sent word that he would not consider any war debt cancellation. By 1934, Chamberlain was able to declare a budget surplus and reverse many of the cuts in unemployment compensation and civil servant salaries he had made after taking office. He told the Commons, "We have now finished the story of Bleak House and are sitting down this afternoon to enjoy the first chapter of Great Expectations."

=== Welfare spending ===
The Unemployed Assistance Board (UAB, established by the Unemployment Act 1934) was largely Chamberlain's creation, and he wished to see the issue of unemployment assistance removed from party political argument. Moreover, Chamberlain "saw the importance of 'providing some interest in life for the large numbers of men never likely to get work', and out of this realisation was to come the responsibility of the UAB for the 'welfare', not merely the maintenance, of the unemployed."

=== Defence spending ===
Defence spending had been heavily cut in Chamberlain's early budgets. By 1935, faced with a resurgent Germany under Hitler's leadership, he was convinced of the need for rearmament. Chamberlain especially urged the strengthening of the Royal Air Force, realising that Britain's historical bulwark, the English Channel, was no defence against air power.

In 1935, MacDonald stood down as prime minister, and Baldwin became prime minister for the third time. In the 1935 general election, the Conservative-dominated National Government lost 90 seats from its massive 1931 majority, but still retained an overwhelming majority of 255 in the House of Commons. During the campaign, deputy Labour leader Arthur Greenwood had attacked Chamberlain for spending money on rearmament, saying that the rearmament policy was "the merest scaremongering; disgraceful in a statesman of Mr Chamberlain's responsible position, to suggest that more millions of money needed to be spent on armaments."

=== Role in the abdication crisis ===
Chamberlain is believed to have had a significant role in the 1936 abdication crisis. He wrote in his diary that Wallis Simpson, Edward VIII's intended wife, was "an entirely unscrupulous woman who is not in love with the King but is exploiting him for her own purposes. She has already ruined him in money and jewels ..." In common with the rest of the Cabinet, except Duff Cooper, he agreed with Baldwin that the King should abdicate if he married Simpson, and on 6 December he and Baldwin both stressed that the King should make his decision before Christmas; by one account, he believed that the uncertainty was "hurting the Christmas trade". The King abdicated on 10 December, four days after the meeting.

Soon after the abdication Baldwin announced that he would remain until shortly after the coronation of King George VI and Queen Elizabeth. On 28 May, two weeks after the Coronation, Baldwin resigned, advising the King to send for Chamberlain. Austen did not live to see his brother's appointment as prime minister having died two months earlier.

== Premiership (1937–1940) ==
=== Appointment ===
Upon his appointment, Chamberlain considered calling a general election, but with three and a half years remaining in the current Parliament's term he decided to wait. At 68 he was the second-oldest person in the 20th century (after Henry Campbell-Bannerman) to become prime minister for the first time, and was widely seen as a caretaker who would lead the Conservative Party until the next election and then step down in favour of a younger man, with Foreign Secretary Anthony Eden a likely candidate. From the start of Chamberlain's premiership a number of would-be successors were rumoured to be jockeying for the position.

Chamberlain had disliked what he considered to be the overly sentimental attitude of both Baldwin and MacDonald on Cabinet appointments and reshuffles. Although he had worked closely with the President of the Board of Trade, Walter Runciman, on the tariff issue, Chamberlain dismissed him from his post, instead offering him the token position of Lord Privy Seal, which an angry Runciman declined. Chamberlain thought Runciman, a member of the Liberal National Party, to be lazy. Soon after taking office Chamberlain instructed his ministers to prepare two-year policy programmes. These reports were to be integrated with the intent of co-ordinating the passage of legislation through the current Parliament, the term of which was to expire in November 1940.

At the time of his appointment, Chamberlain's personality was not well known to the public, though he had made annual budget broadcasts for six years. According to Chamberlain biographer Robert Self, these appeared relaxed and modern, showing an ability to speak directly to the camera. Chamberlain had few friends among his parliamentary colleagues; an attempt by his parliamentary private secretary, Lord Dunglass (later prime minister himself as Alec Douglas-Home), to bring him to the Commons Smoking Room to socialise with colleagues ended in embarrassing silence. Chamberlain compensated for these shortcomings by devising the most sophisticated press management system employed by a prime minister up to that time, with officials at Number 10, led by his chief of press George Steward, convincing members of the press that they were colleagues sharing power and insider knowledge, and should espouse the government line.

=== Domestic policy ===
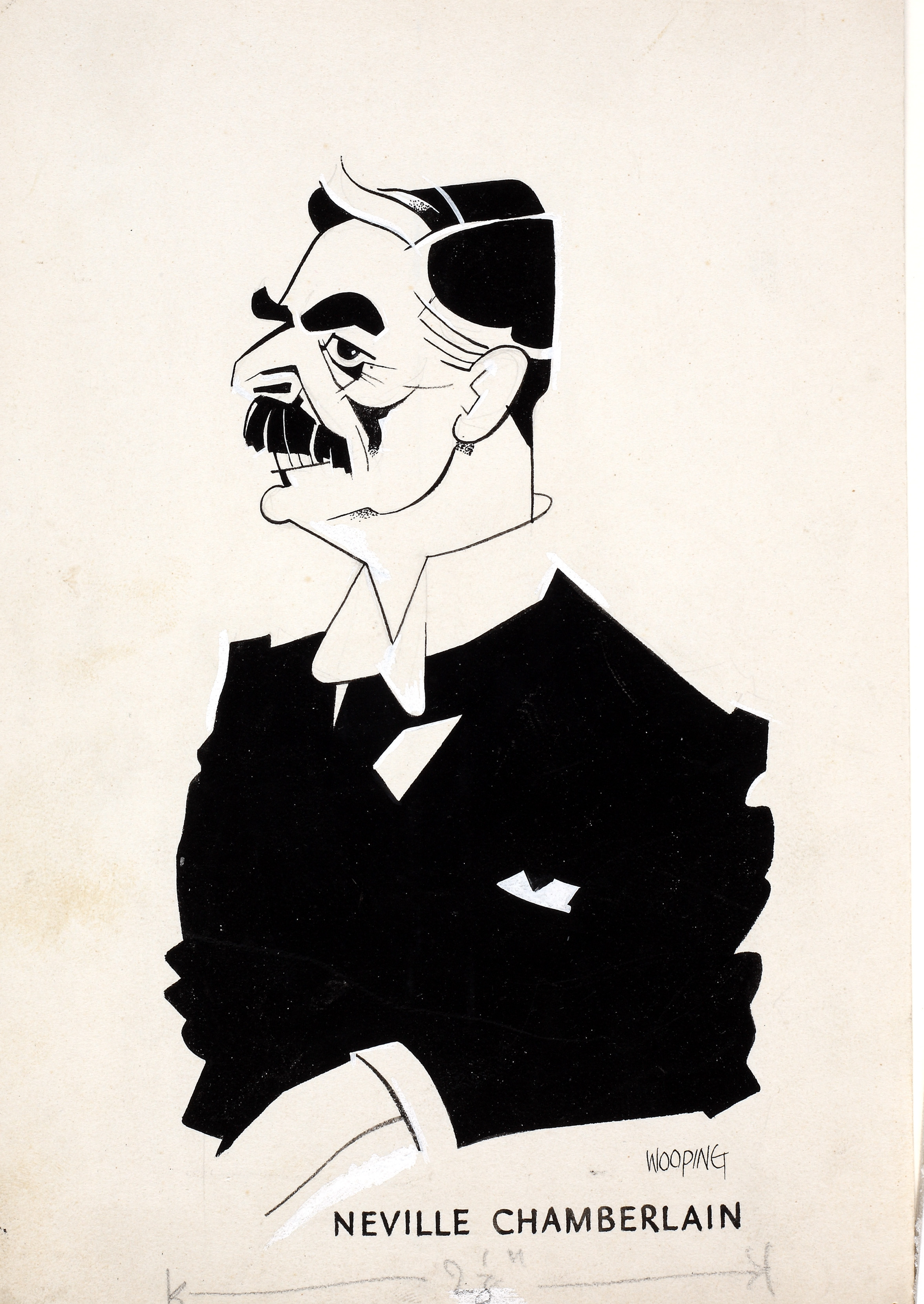
Caricature of Chamberlain, c. 1940

Chamberlain saw his elevation to the premiership as the final glory in a career as a domestic reformer, not realising that he would be remembered for foreign policy decisions. One reason he sought the settlement of European issues was the hope it would allow him to concentrate on domestic affairs.

Soon after attaining the premiership, Chamberlain obtained passage of the Factories Act 1937. This Act was aimed at bettering working conditions in factories, and placed limits on the working hours of women and children. In 1938, Parliament enacted the Coal Act 1938, which allowed for nationalisation of coal deposits. Another major law passed that year was the Holidays with Pay Act 1938. Though the Act only recommended that employers give workers a week off with pay, it led to a great expansion of holiday camps and other leisure accommodation for the working classes.

The Housing Act 1938 provided subsidies aimed at encouraging slum clearance and maintained rent control. Chamberlain's plans for the reform of local government were shelved because of the outbreak of war in 1939. Likewise, the raising of the school-leaving age to 15, scheduled for implementation on 1 September 1939, did not go into effect.

=== Relations with Ireland ===
Relations between the United Kingdom and the Irish Free State had been strained since the 1932 appointment of Éamon de Valera as President of the Executive Council. The Anglo-Irish Trade War, sparked by the withholding of money that Ireland had agreed to pay the United Kingdom, had caused economic losses on both sides, and the two nations were anxious for a settlement. The de Valera government also sought to sever the remaining ties between Ireland and the UK, such as ending the King's status as Irish Head of State. As chancellor, Chamberlain had taken a hard-line stance against concessions to the Irish, but as premier sought a settlement with Ireland, being persuaded that the strained ties were affecting relations with other Dominions.

Talks had been suspended under Baldwin in 1936 but resumed in November 1937. De Valera sought not only to alter the constitutional status of Ireland, but to overturn other aspects of the Anglo-Irish Treaty, most notably the issue of partition, as well as obtaining full control of the three Treaty Ports which had remained in British control. Britain, on the other hand, wished to retain the Treaty Ports, at least in time of war, and to obtain the money that Ireland had agreed to pay.

The Irish proved very tough negotiators, so much so that Chamberlain complained that one of de Valera's offers had "presented United Kingdom ministers with a three-leafed shamrock, none of the leaves of which had any advantages for the UK." With the talks facing deadlock, Chamberlain made the Irish a final offer in March 1938 which acceded to many Irish positions, though he was confident that he had "only given up the small things", and the agreements were signed on 25 April 1938. The issue of partition was not resolved, but the Irish agreed to pay £10 million to the British. There was no provision in the treaties for British access to the Treaty Ports in time of war, but Chamberlain accepted de Valera's oral assurance that in the event of war the British would have access. Conservative backbencher Winston Churchill attacked the agreements in Parliament for surrendering the Treaty Ports, which he described as the "sentinel towers of the Western Approaches". When war came, de Valera denied Britain access to the Treaty Ports under Irish neutrality. Churchill railed against these treaties in The Gathering Storm, stating that he "never saw the House of Commons more completely misled" and that "members were made to feel very differently about it when our existence hung in the balance during the Battle of the Atlantic." Chamberlain believed that the Treaty Ports were unusable if Ireland was hostile, and deemed their loss worthwhile to assure friendly relations with Dublin.

=== Foreign policy ===
==== Early days (May 1937 – March 1938) ====
Chamberlain sought to conciliate Germany and make the Nazi state a partner in a stable Europe. He believed Germany could be satisfied by the restoration of some of its colonies, and during the Rhineland crisis of March 1936 he had stated that "if we were in sight of an all-round settlement the British government ought to consider the question" of restoration of colonies.

The new prime minister's attempts to secure such a settlement were frustrated because Germany was in no hurry to talk to Britain. Foreign Minister Konstantin von Neurath was supposed to visit Britain in July 1937 but cancelled his visit. Lord Halifax, the Lord President of the Council, visited Germany privately in November and met Hitler and other German officials. Both Chamberlain and British Ambassador to Germany Nevile Henderson pronounced the visit a success. Foreign Office officials complained that the Halifax visit made it appear Britain was too eager for talks, and the Foreign Secretary, Anthony Eden, felt that he had been bypassed.

Chamberlain also bypassed Eden while the latter was on holiday by opening direct talks with Fascist Italy, an international pariah for its invasion and conquest of Ethiopia. At a Cabinet meeting on 8 September 1937, Chamberlain indicated that he saw "the lessening of the tension between this country and Italy as a very valuable contribution toward the pacification and appeasement of Europe" which would "weaken the Rome–Berlin axis." Chamberlain also set up a private line of communication with the Italian Duce Benito Mussolini through the Italian Ambassador, Count Dino Grandi.

In February 1938, Hitler began to press the Austrian government to accept Anschluss or joining Germany and Austria into a single state. Chamberlain believed that it was essential to cement relations with Italy in the hope that an Anglo–Italian alliance would forestall Hitler from imposing his rule over Austria. Eden believed that Chamberlain was being too hasty in talking with Italy and holding out the prospect of de jure recognition of Italy's conquest of Ethiopia. Chamberlain concluded that Eden would have to accept his policy or resign. The Cabinet heard both men out but unanimously decided for Chamberlain, and despite efforts by other Cabinet members to prevent it, Eden resigned from office. In later years, Eden tried to portray his resignation as a stand against appeasement (Churchill described him in The Second World War as "one strong young figure standing up against long, dismal, drawling tides of drift and surrender") but many ministers and MPs believed there was no issue at stake worth resignation. Chamberlain appointed Lord Halifax as foreign secretary in Eden's place.

==== Road to Munich (March 1938 – September 1938) ====
In March 1938, Austria became a part of Germany in the Anschluss. Though some Austrians requested help from Britain, none was forthcoming. Britain did send Berlin a strong note of protest without specifying any actual action that the British government might take. In addressing the Cabinet shortly after German forces crossed the border, Chamberlain placed blame on both Germany and Austria. Chamberlain noted,

It is perfectly evident now that force is the only argument Germany understands and that "collective security" cannot offer any prospect of preventing such events until it can show a visible force of overwhelming strength backed by the determination to use it. ... Heaven knows I don't want to get back to alliances but if Germany continues to behave as she has done lately she may drive us to it.

On 14 March, the day after the Anschluss, Chamberlain addressed the House of Commons and strongly condemned the methods used by the Germans in the takeover of Austria. Chamberlain's address met with the approval of the House.

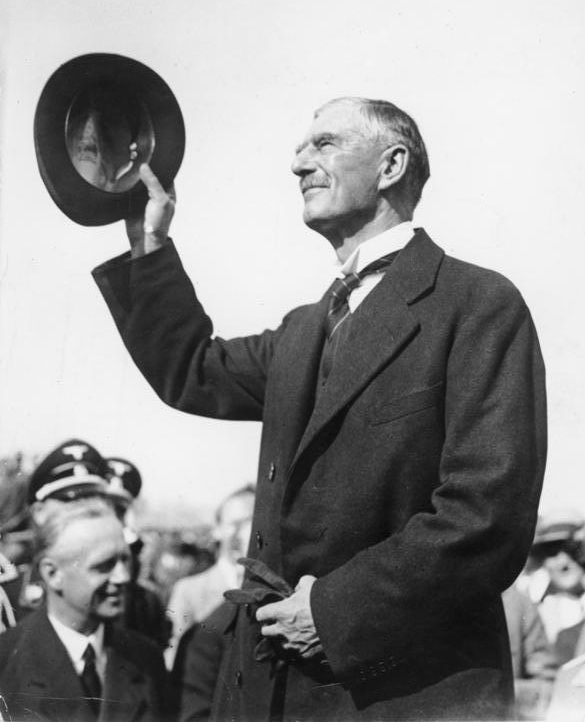
Chamberlain arrives in Munich, September 1938.

With Austria absorbed by Germany, attention turned to Hitler's obvious next target, the Sudetenland region of Czechoslovakia. With three million ethnic Germans, the Sudetenland represented the largest German population outside the Reich and Hitler began to call for the union of the region with Germany. Britain had no military obligations toward Czechoslovakia, but France and Czechoslovakia had a mutual assistance pact and both the French and Czechoslovaks also had an alliance with the Soviet Union. After the fall of Austria, the Cabinet's Foreign Policy Committee considered seeking a "grand alliance" to thwart Germany or, alternatively, an assurance to France of assistance if the French went to war. Instead, the committee chose to advocate that Czechoslovakia be urged to make the best terms it could with Germany. The full Cabinet agreed with the committee's recommendation, influenced by a report from the chiefs of staff stating that there was little that Britain could do to help the Czechs in the event of a German invasion. Chamberlain reported to an amenable House that he was unwilling to limit his government's discretion by giving commitments.

Britain and Italy signed an agreement on 16 April 1938. In exchange for de jure recognition of Italy's Ethiopian conquest, Italy agreed to withdraw some Italian "volunteers" from the Nationalist (pro-Franco) side of the Spanish Civil War. By this point, the Nationalists strongly had the upper hand in that conflict, and they completed their victory the following year. Later that month, the new French prime minister, Édouard Daladier, came to London for talks with Chamberlain, and agreed to follow the British position on Czechoslovakia.

In May, Czech border guards shot two Sudeten German farmers who were trying to cross the border from Germany into Czechoslovakia without stopping for border controls. This incident caused unrest among the Sudeten Germans, and Germany was then said to be moving troops to the border. In response to the report, Prague moved troops to the German border. Halifax sent a note to Germany warning that if France intervened in the crisis on Czechoslovakia's behalf, Britain might support France. Tensions appeared to calm, and Chamberlain and Halifax were applauded for their "masterly" handling of the crisis. Though it was not known at the time, it later became clear that Germany had had no plans for a May invasion of Czechoslovakia. Nonetheless, the Chamberlain government received strong and almost unanimous support from the British press.

Negotiations between the Czech government and the Sudeten Germans dragged on through mid-1938. They achieved little result; Sudeten leader Konrad Henlein was under private instructions from Hitler not to reach an agreement. On 3 August, Walter Runciman (by now Lord Runciman) travelled to Prague as a mediator sent by the British government. Over the next two weeks, Runciman met separately with Henlein, Czechoslovak president Edvard Beneš, and other leaders, but made no progress. On 30 August, Chamberlain met his Cabinet and Ambassador Henderson and secured their backing—with only First Lord of the Admiralty Duff Cooper dissenting against Chamberlain's policy to pressure Czechoslovakia into making concessions, on the grounds that Britain was then in no position to back up any threat to go to war.

Chamberlain realised that Hitler would likely signal his intentions in his 12 September speech at the annual Nuremberg Rally, and so he discussed with his advisors how to respond if war seemed likely. In consultation with his close advisor Horace Wilson, Chamberlain set out "Plan Z". If war seemed inevitable, Chamberlain would fly to Germany to negotiate directly with Hitler.

=== September 1938: Munich ===
==== Preliminary meetings ====
Lord Runciman continued his attempts to pressure the Czechoslovak government into concessions. On 7 September there was an altercation involving Sudeten members of the Czechoslovak parliament in the North Moravian city of Ostrava (Mährisch-Ostrau in German). The Germans made considerable propaganda out of the incident, though the Prague government tried to conciliate them by dismissing Czech police who had been involved. As the tempest grew, Runciman concluded that there was no point in attempting further negotiations until after Hitler's speech. The mission never resumed.

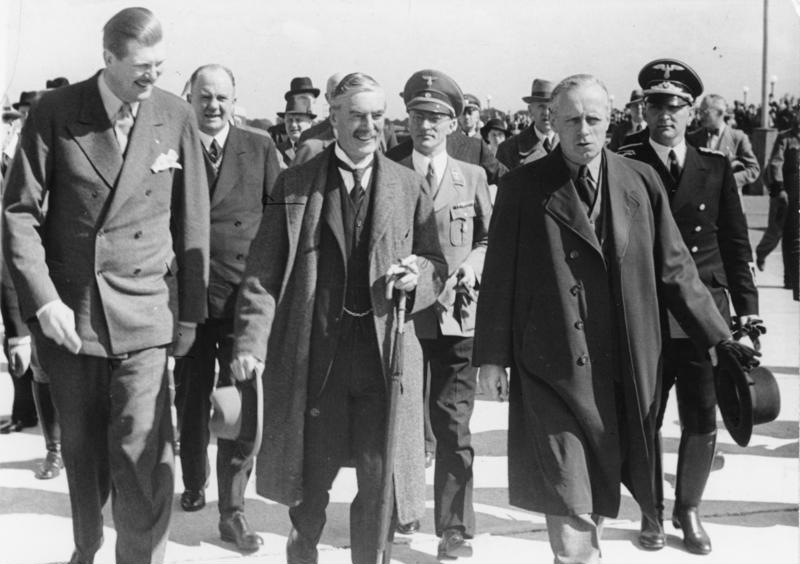
Chamberlain (centre, hat and umbrella in hands) walks with German foreign minister Joachim von Ribbentrop (right) as the Prime Minister leaves for home after the Berchtesgaden meeting, 16 September 1938. On the left is Alexander von Dörnberg.

There was tremendous tension in the final days before Hitler's speech on the last day of the Rally, as Britain, France, and Czechoslovakia all partially mobilised their troops. Thousands gathered outside 10 Downing Street on the night of the speech. At last Hitler addressed his wildly enthusiastic followers:

The condition of the Sudeten Germans is indescribable. It is sought to annihilate them. As human beings they are oppressed and scandalously treated in an intolerable fashion ... The depriving of these people of their rights must come to an end. ... I have stated that the "Reich" would not tolerate any further oppression of these three and a half million Germans, and I would ask the statesmen of foreign countries to be convinced that this is no mere form of words.

The following morning, 13 September, Chamberlain and the Cabinet were informed by Secret Service sources that all German embassies had been told that Germany would invade Czechoslovakia on 25 September. Convinced that the French would not fight (Daladier was privately proposing a three-Power summit to settle the Sudeten question), Chamberlain decided to implement "Plan Z" and sent a message to Hitler that he was willing to come to Germany to negotiate. Hitler accepted and Chamberlain flew to Germany on the morning of 15 September; this was the first time, excepting a short jaunt at an industrial fair, that Chamberlain had ever flown. Chamberlain flew to Munich and then travelled by rail to Hitler's retreat at Berchtesgaden (see Berchtesgaden meeting).

The face-to-face meeting lasted about three hours. Hitler demanded the annexation of the Sudetenland, and through questioning him, Chamberlain was able to obtain assurances that Hitler had no designs on the remainder of Czechoslovakia or on the areas in Eastern Europe which had German minorities. After the meeting Chamberlain returned to London, believing that he had obtained a breathing space during which agreement could be reached and the peace preserved. Under the proposals made at Berchtesgaden the Sudetenland would be annexed by Germany if a plebiscite in the Sudetenland favoured it. Czechoslovakia would receive international guarantees of its independence which would replace existing treaty obligations—principally the French pledge to the Czechoslovaks. The French agreed to the requirements. Under considerable pressure the Czechoslovaks also agreed, causing the Czechoslovak government to fall.

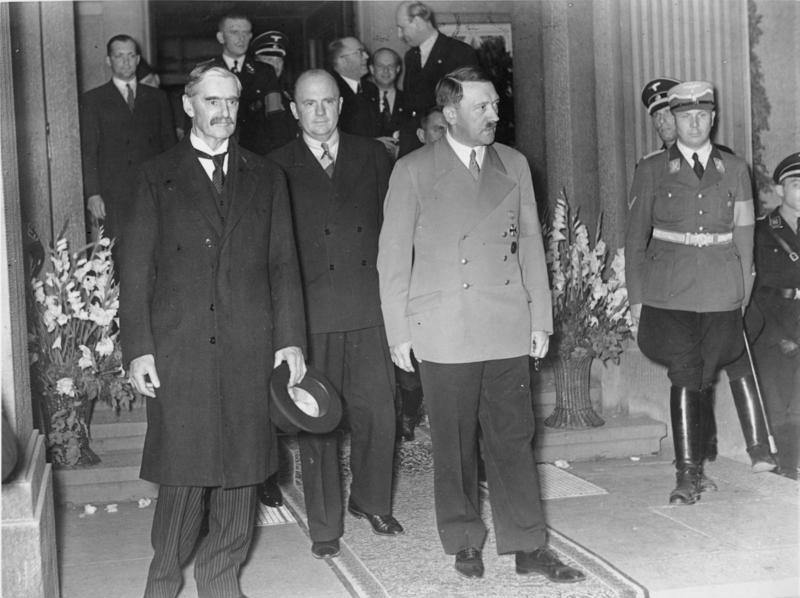
Chamberlain (left) and Hitler leave the Bad Godesberg meeting, 23 September 1938.

Chamberlain flew back to Germany, meeting Hitler in Bad Godesberg on 22 September. Hitler brushed aside the proposals of the previous meeting, saying "that won't do any more". Hitler demanded immediate occupation of the Sudetenland and that Polish and Hungarian territorial claims on Czechoslovakia be addressed. Chamberlain objected strenuously, telling Hitler that he had worked to bring the French and Czechoslovaks into line with Germany's demands, so much so that he had been accused of giving in to dictators and had been booed on his departure that morning. Hitler was unmoved.

That evening, Chamberlain told Lord Halifax that the "meeting with Herr Hitler had been most unsatisfactory". The following day, Hitler kept Chamberlain waiting until mid-afternoon, when he sent a five-page letter, in German, outlining the demands he had made orally the previous day. Chamberlain replied by offering to act as an intermediary with the Czechoslovaks, and suggested that Hitler put his demands in a memorandum which could be circulated to the French and Czechoslovaks.

The leaders met again late on the evening of 23 September—a meeting that stretched into the early morning hours. Hitler demanded that fleeing Czechs in the zones to be occupied take nothing with them. He extended his deadline for occupation of the Sudetenland to 1 October—the date he had long before secretly set for the invasion of Czechoslovakia. The meeting ended amicably, with Chamberlain confiding to Hitler his hopes they would be able to work out other problems in Europe in the same spirit. Hitler hinted that the Sudetenland fulfilled his territorial ambitions in Europe. Chamberlain flew back to London, saying "It is up to the Czechs now."

==== Munich conference ====
Hitler's proposals met with resistance not only from the French and Czechoslovaks, but also from some members of Chamberlain's cabinet. With no agreement in sight, war seemed inevitable. Chamberlain issued a press statement calling on Germany to abandon the threat of force in exchange for British help in obtaining the concessions it sought. On the evening of 27 September, Chamberlain addressed the nation by radio, and after thanking those who wrote to him, stated:

How horrible, fantastic, incredible it is that we should be digging trenches and trying on gas-masks here because of a quarrel in a far-away country between people of whom we know nothing. It seems still more impossible that a quarrel that has already been settled in principle should be the subject of war.

On 28 September, Chamberlain called on Hitler to invite him to Germany again to seek a solution through a summit involving the British, French, Germans, and Italians. Hitler replied favourably, and word of this response came to Chamberlain as he was winding up a speech in the House of Commons which sat in gloomy anticipation of war. Chamberlain informed the House of this in his speech. The response was a passionate demonstration, with members cheering Chamberlain wildly. Even diplomats in the galleries applauded. Lord Dunglass later commented, "There were a lot of appeasers in Parliament that day."

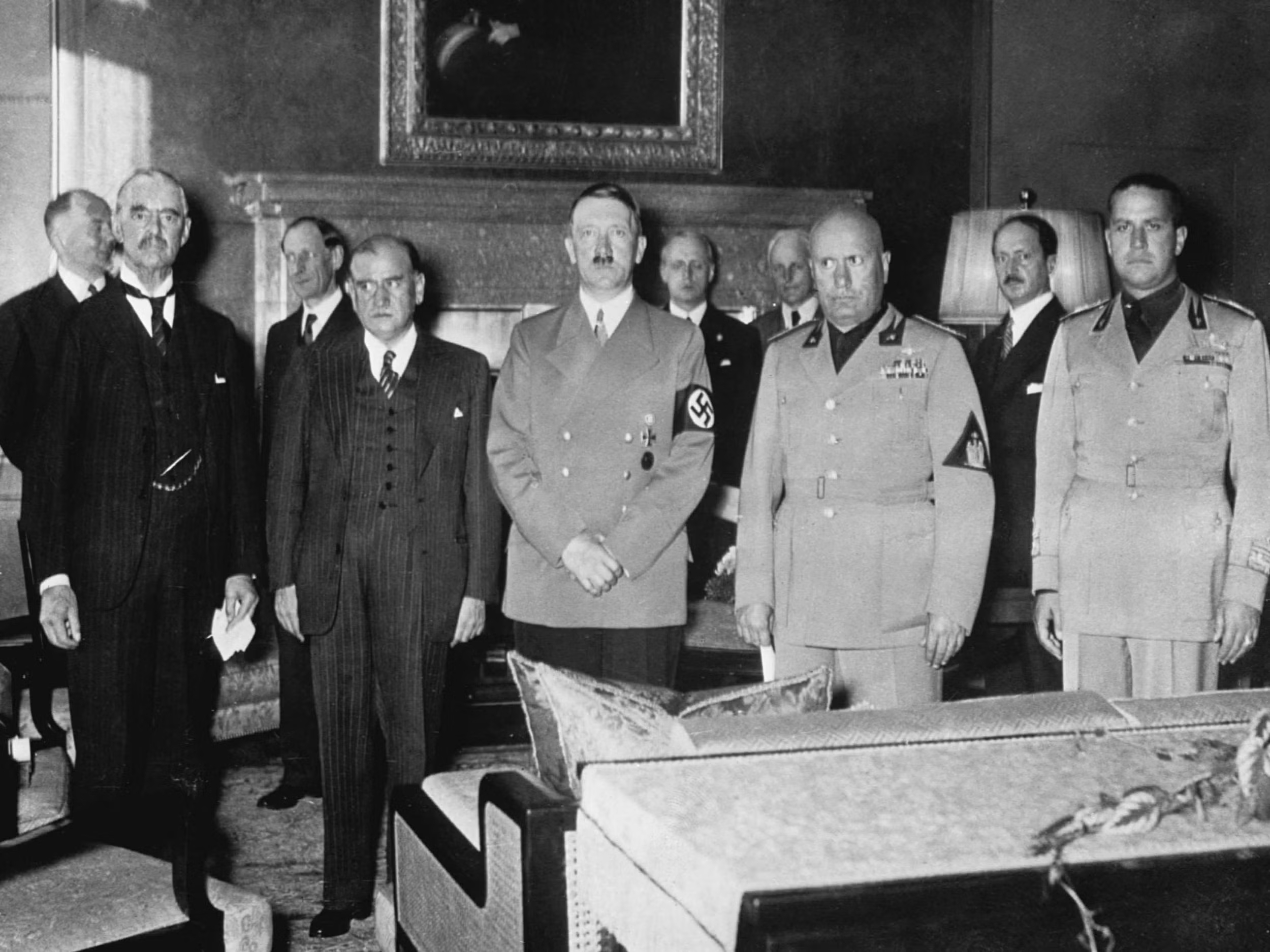
From left to right, Chamberlain, Daladier, Hitler, Mussolini and Italian foreign minister Count Galeazzo Ciano as they prepare to sign the Munich Agreement

On the morning of 29 September Chamberlain left Heston Aerodrome (to the east of today's Heathrow Airport) for his third and final visit to Germany. On arrival in Munich the British delegation was taken directly to the Führerbau, where Daladier, Mussolini, and Hitler soon arrived. The four leaders and their translators held an informal meeting; Hitler said that he intended to invade Czechoslovakia on 1 October. Mussolini distributed a proposal similar to Hitler's Bad Godesberg terms. In reality, the proposal had been drafted by German officials and transmitted to Rome the previous day. The four leaders debated the draft and Chamberlain raised the question of compensation for the Czechoslovak government and citizens, but Hitler refused to consider this.

The leaders were joined by advisors after lunch, and hours were spent on long discussions of each clause of the "Italian" draft agreement. Late that evening the British and French left for their hotels, saying that they had to seek advice from their respective capitals. Meanwhile, the Germans and Italians enjoyed the feast which Hitler had intended for all the participants. During this break, Chamberlain advisor Horace Wilson met with the Czechoslovaks; he informed them of the draft agreement and asked which districts were particularly important to them. The conference resumed at about 10 pm and was mostly in the hands of a small drafting committee. At 1:30 am the Munich Agreement was ready for signing, though the signing ceremony was delayed when Hitler discovered that the ornate inkwell on his desk was empty.

Chamberlain and Daladier returned to their hotel and informed the Czechoslovaks of the agreement. The two prime ministers urged quick acceptance by the Czechoslovaks of the agreement, since the evacuation by the Czechs was to begin the following day. At 12:30 pm the Czechoslovak government in Prague objected to the decision but agreed to its terms.

==== Aftermath and reception ====
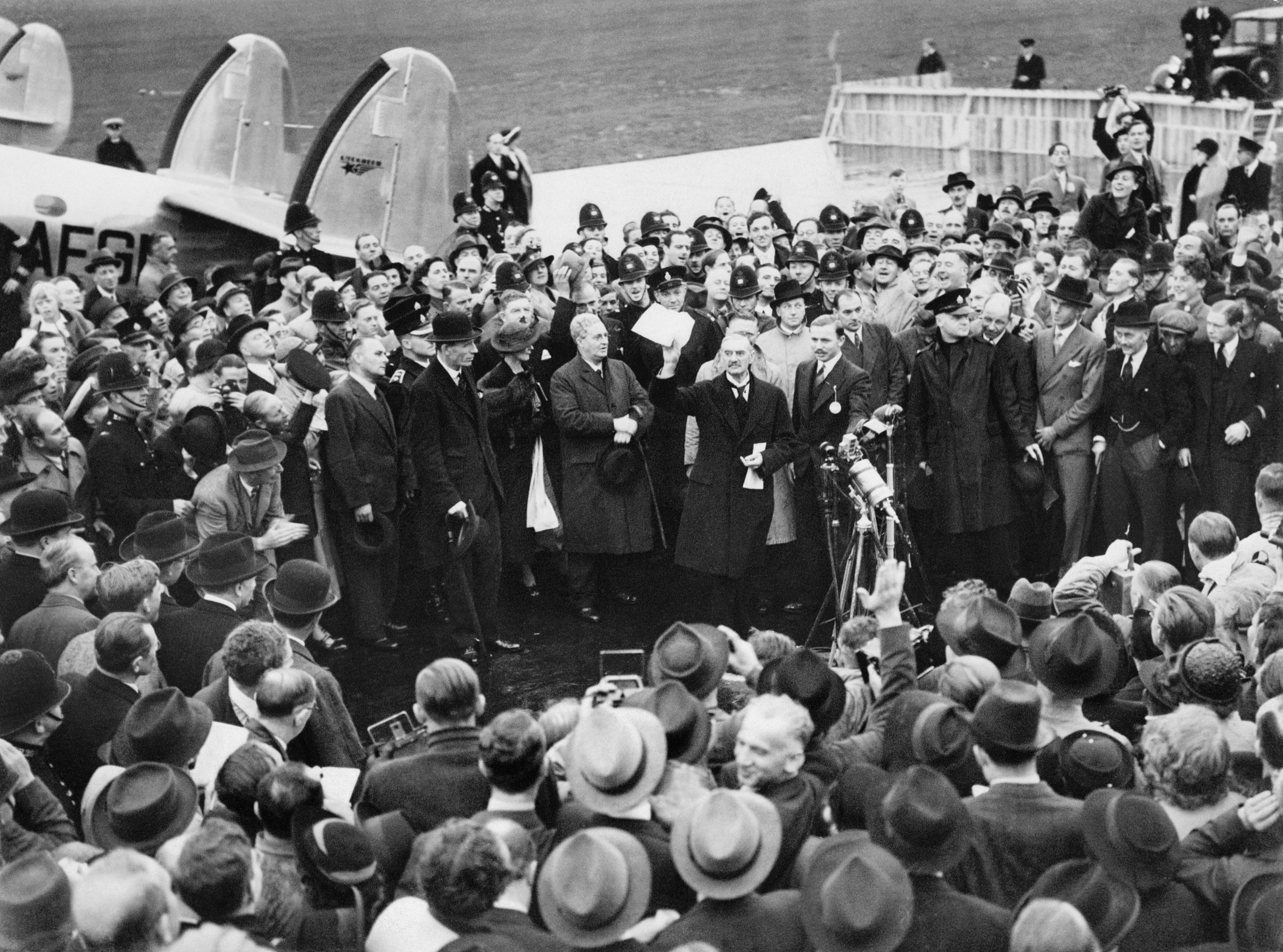
Chamberlain holding up the paper signed by both Hitler and himself on his return from Munich to Heston Aerodrome

Chamberlain's return to Britain after Munich
Neville Chamberlain speaks to the crowd upon arrival at Heston Aerodrome, 30 September 1938.

Before leaving the Führerbau, Chamberlain requested a private conference with Hitler. Hitler agreed, and the two met at Hitler's apartment in the city later that morning. Chamberlain urged restraint in the implementation of the agreement and requested that the Germans not bomb Prague if the Czechs resisted, to which Hitler seemed agreeable. Chamberlain took from his pocket a paper headed "Anglo–German Agreement", which contained three paragraphs, including a statement that the two nations considered the Munich Agreement "symbolic of the desire of our two peoples never to go to war again." According to Chamberlain, Hitler interjected "Ja! Ja!" ("Yes! Yes!"). The two men signed the paper then and there. When, later that day, German foreign minister Joachim von Ribbentrop remonstrated with Hitler for signing it, the Führer replied, "Oh, don't take it so seriously. That piece of paper is of no further significance whatever." Chamberlain, on the other hand, patted his breast pocket when he returned to his hotel for lunch and said, "I've got it!" Word leaked of the outcome of the meetings before Chamberlain's return, causing delight among many in London but gloom for Churchill and his supporters.

Chamberlain returned to London in triumph. Large crowds mobbed Heston, where he was met by the Lord Chamberlain, the Earl of Clarendon, who gave him a letter from King George VI assuring him of the Empire's lasting gratitude and urging him to come straight to Buckingham Palace to report. The streets were so packed with cheering people that it took Chamberlain an hour and a half to journey the nine miles (14 km) from Heston to the Palace. After reporting to the King, Chamberlain and his wife appeared on the Palace balcony with the King and Queen. He then went to Downing Street; both the street and the front hall of Number 10 were packed. As he headed upstairs to address the crowd from a first-floor window, someone called to him, "Neville, go up to the window and say 'peace for our time'." (Note: "Peace in our time", a common misquotation, is a quotation from the Book of Common Prayer, and can be found as a misquotation in The New York Times as early as 2 October 1938. Faber 2008, pp. 5–7.) Chamberlain turned around and responded, "No, I don't do that sort of thing." Nevertheless, in his statement to the crowd, Chamberlain recalled the words of his predecessor, Benjamin Disraeli, upon the latter's return from the Congress of Berlin: (Note: Disraeli (or more properly Lord Beaconsfield) had stated "Lord Salisbury and I have brought you peace—but a peace, I hope, with honour." See Keyes 2006, p. 160.)

My good friends, this is the second time there has come back from Germany to Downing Street peace with honour. I believe it is peace for our time. We thank you from the bottom of our hearts. Now I recommend you go home, and sleep quietly in your beds.

King George issued a statement to his people, "After the magnificent efforts of the Prime Minister in the cause of peace it is my fervent hope that a new era of friendship and prosperity may be dawning among the peoples of the world." When the King met Duff Cooper, who resigned as First Lord of the Admiralty over the Munich Agreement, he told Cooper that he respected people who had the courage of their convictions, but could not agree with him. He wrote to his mother, Queen Mary, that "the Prime Minister was delighted with the results of his mission, as are we all." She responded to her son with anger against those who spoke against Chamberlain: "He brought home peace, why can't they be grateful?" Most newspapers supported Chamberlain uncritically, and he received thousands of gifts, from a silver dinner service to many of his trademark umbrellas.

The Commons discussed the Munich Agreement on 3 October. Though Cooper opened by setting forth the reasons for his resignation and Churchill spoke harshly against the pact, no Conservative voted against the government. Only between 20 and 30 abstained, including Churchill, Eden, Cooper, and Harold Macmillan.

=== Path to war (October 1938 – August 1939) ===
In the aftermath of Munich, Chamberlain continued to pursue a course of cautious rearmament. He told the Cabinet in early October 1938, "[I]t would be madness for the country to stop rearming until we were convinced that other countries would act in the same way. For the time being, therefore, we should relax no particle of effort until our deficiencies had been made good." Later in October, he resisted calls to put industry on a war footing, convinced that such an action would show Hitler that Chamberlain had decided to abandon Munich. Chamberlain hoped that the understanding he had signed with Hitler at Munich would lead toward a general settlement of European disputes, but Hitler expressed no public interest in following up on the accord. Having considered a general election immediately following Munich, Chamberlain instead reshuffled his Cabinet. By the end of the year, public concerns caused Chamberlain to conclude that "to get rid of this uneasy and disgruntled House of Commons by a General Election" would be "suicidal".

Despite Hitler's relative quietness as the "Reich" absorbed the Sudetenland, foreign policy concerns continued to preoccupy Chamberlain. He made trips to Paris and Rome, hoping to persuade the French to hasten their rearmament and Mussolini to be a positive influence on Hitler. Several of his Cabinet members, led by Foreign Secretary Lord Halifax, began to draw away from the appeasement policy. Halifax was by now convinced that Munich, though "better than a European war," had been "a horrid business and humiliating". Public revulsion over the pogrom of Kristallnacht on 9 November 1938 made any attempt at a "rapprochement" with Hitler unacceptable, though Chamberlain did not abandon his hopes.

Still hoping for reconciliation with Germany, Chamberlain made a major speech in Birmingham on 28 January 1939, in which he expressed his desire for international peace, and had an advance copy sent to Hitler at Berchtesgaden. Hitler seemed to respond; in his "Reichstag" speech on 30 January 1939, he stated that he wanted a "long peace". Chamberlain was confident that improvements in British defence since Munich would bring the dictator to the bargaining table. This belief was reinforced by a German official's conciliatory speech welcoming Ambassador Henderson back to Berlin after an absence for medical treatment in Britain. Chamberlain responded with a speech in Blackburn on 22 February hoping that the nations would resolve their differences through trade, and was gratified when his comments were printed in German newspapers. With matters appearing to improve, Chamberlain's rule over the House of Commons was firm and he was convinced the government would "romp home" in a late 1939 election.

On 15 March 1939, Germany invaded the Czech provinces of Bohemia and Moravia, including Prague. Though Chamberlain's initial parliamentary response was, according to biographer Nick Smart, "feeble", within 48 hours he had spoken more forcefully against the German aggression. In another Birmingham speech, on 17 March, Chamberlain warned that Hitler was attempting to "dominate the world by force" and that "no greater mistake could be made than to suppose that because it believes war to be a senseless and cruel thing the nation has so lost its fibre that it will not take part to the utmost of its power in resisting such a challenge if it were ever made." The Prime Minister questioned whether the invasion of Czechoslovakia was "the end of an old adventure, or the beginning of a new" and whether it was "a step in the direction of an attempt to dominate the world by force." Colonial Secretary Malcolm MacDonald said, "whereas the Prime Minister was once a strong advocate of peace, he has now definitely swung around to the war point of view." This speech was met with widespread approval in Britain and recruitment for the armed services increased considerably.

Chamberlain set out to build an interlocking series of defence pacts among the remaining European countries as a means of deterring Hitler from war. He sought an agreement among Britain, France, the USSR, and Poland, whereby the first three would go to the assistance of Poland if her independence were threatened, but Polish mistrust of the Soviet Union caused those negotiations to fail. Instead, on 31 March 1939, Chamberlain informed an approving House of Commons of British and French guarantees that they would lend Poland all possible aid in the event of any action which threatened Polish independence. In the ensuing debate, Eden stated that the nation was now united behind the government. Even Churchill and Lloyd George praised Chamberlain's government for issuing the guarantee to Poland.

The Prime Minister took other steps to deter Hitler from aggression. He doubled the size of the Territorial Army, created a Ministry of Supply to expedite the provision of equipment to the armed forces, and instituted peacetime conscription. The Italian invasion of Albania on 7 April 1939 led to guarantees being given to Greece and Romania. On 17 June 1939, Handley Page received an order for 200 Hampden twin-engined medium bombers, and by 3 September 1939, the chain of radar stations girding the British coast was fully operational.

Chamberlain was reluctant to seek a military alliance with the Soviet Union; he distrusted Joseph Stalin ideologically and felt that there was little to gain, given the recent massive purges in the Red Army. Much of his Cabinet favoured such an alliance, and when Poland withdrew her objection to an Anglo–Soviet alliance, Chamberlain had little choice but to proceed. The talks with Soviet foreign minister Vyacheslav Molotov, to which Britain sent only a low-level delegation, dragged on over several months and eventually foundered on 14 August 1939 when Poland and Romania refused to allow Soviet troops to be stationed on their territories. A week after the failure of these talks, the Soviet Union and Germany signed the Molotov–Ribbentrop Pact, committing the countries to non-aggression toward each other. A secret agreement divided up Poland in the event of war. Chamberlain had disregarded rumours of a Soviet–German "rapprochement" and was dismissive of the publicly announced pact, stating that it in no way affected British obligations toward Poland. On 23 August 1939, Chamberlain had Henderson deliver a letter to Hitler telling him that Britain was fully prepared to comply with its obligations to Poland. Hitler instructed his generals to prepare for an invasion of Poland, telling them, "Our enemies are small worms. I saw them at Munich."

=== War leader (1939–1940) ===
==== Declaration of war ====
Germany invaded Poland in the early morning of 1 September 1939. The British Cabinet met late that morning and issued a warning to Germany that unless it withdrew from Polish territory the UK would carry out its obligations to Poland. When the House of Commons met at 6:00 pm, Chamberlain and Labour deputy leader Arthur Greenwood (deputising for the sick Clement Attlee) entered the chamber to loud cheers. Chamberlain spoke emotionally, laying the blame for the conflict on Hitler.

No formal declaration of war was immediately made. French foreign minister Georges Bonnet stated that France could do nothing until its parliament met on the evening of 2 September. Bonnet was trying to rally support for a Munich-style summit proposed by the Italians to be held on 5 September. The British Cabinet demanded that Hitler be given an ultimatum at once and if troops were not withdrawn by the end of 2 September, war would be declared forthwith. Chamberlain and Halifax were convinced by Bonnet's pleas, from Paris, that France needed more time for mobilisation and evacuation. Chamberlain postponed the expiry of the ultimatum which had, in fact, not yet been served. Chamberlain's lengthy statement to the House of Commons made no mention of an ultimatum and was consequently poorly received by the House. When Greenwood rose to "speak for the working classes," Conservative backbencher and former First Lord of the Admiralty Leo Amery shouted, "Speak for England, Arthur!" implying that the Prime Minister was not doing so. Chamberlain replied that telephone difficulties were making it hard to communicate with Paris and tried to dispel fears that the French were weakening. He had little success; too many members knew of Bonnet's efforts. National Labour MP and diarist Harold Nicolson later wrote, "In those few minutes he flung away his reputation." The seeming delay gave rise to fears that Chamberlain would again seek a settlement with Hitler. Chamberlain's last peacetime Cabinet met at 11:30 that night, with a thunderstorm raging outside, and determined that the ultimatum would be presented in Berlin at nine o'clock the following morning—to expire two hours later, before the House of Commons convened at noon. At 11:15 am, 3 September 1939, Chamberlain addressed the nation by radio, stating that the United Kingdom was at war with Germany:

I am speaking to you from the Cabinet Room at 10, Downing Street. This morning the British Ambassador in Berlin handed the German Government a final Note stating that unless we heard from them by 11 O'clock that they were prepared at once to withdraw their troops from Poland a state of war would exist between us. I have to tell you now that no such undertaking has been received, and that consequently this country is at war with Germany.

You can imagine what a bitter blow it is to me that all my long struggle to win peace has failed. Yet I cannot believe that there is anything more or anything different that I could have done and that would have been more successful. Up to the very last it would have been quite possible to have arranged a peaceful and honourable settlement between Germany and Poland. But Hitler would not have it. He had evidently made up his mind to attack Poland whatever happened, and although he now says he put forward reasonable proposals which were rejected by the Poles, that is not a true statement. The proposals were never shown to the Poles, nor to us, and, though they were announced in a German broadcast on Thursday night, Hitler did not wait to hear comments on them, but ordered his troops to cross the Polish frontier the next morning. His action shows convincingly that there is no chance of expecting that this man will ever give up his practice of using force to gain his will. He can only be stopped by force. We and France are to-day, in fulfillment of our obligations, going to the aid of Poland, who is so bravely resisting this wicked and unprovoked attack upon her people. We have a clear conscience. We have done all that any country could do to establish peace, but a situation in which no word given by Germany's ruler could be trusted and no people or country could feel themselves safe had become intolerable. And now that we have resolved to finish it, I know that you will all play your part with calmness and courage.

That afternoon Chamberlain addressed the House of Commons' first Sunday session in over 120 years. He spoke to a quiet House in a statement which even opponents termed "restrained and therefore effective":

Everything that I have worked for, everything that I have hoped for, everything that I have believed in during my public life has crashed into ruins. There is only one thing left for me to do: that is devote what strength and power I have to forwarding the victory of the cause for which we have sacrificed so much.

==== "Phoney War" ====
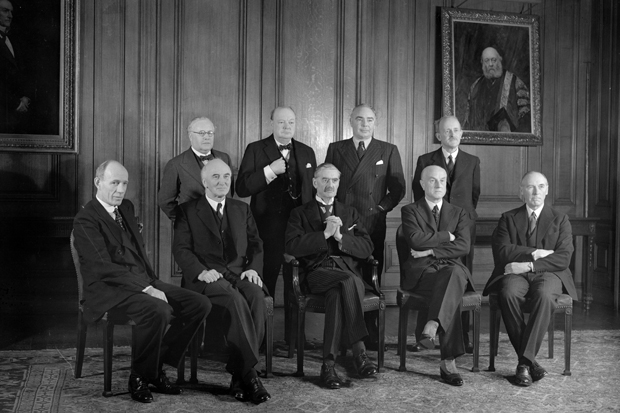
The British war cabinet, from September 1939 to May 1940.

Chamberlain instituted a War Cabinet and invited the Labour and Liberal parties to join his government, but they declined. He restored Churchill to the Cabinet as First Lord of the Admiralty, with a seat in the War Cabinet. Chamberlain also gave Eden a government post (dominions secretary) but not a seat in the small War Cabinet. The new First Lord deluged the Prime Minister with a sea of lengthy memos. Chamberlain castigated Churchill for sending so many memos, as the two met in War Cabinet every day. Chamberlain suspected, correctly as it proved after the war, that "these letters are for the purpose of quotation in the Book that he will write hereafter." Chamberlain also deterred some of Churchill's plans, such as Operation Catherine, which would have sent three heavily armoured battleships into the Baltic Sea with an aircraft carrier and other support vessels as a means of stopping shipments of iron ore to Germany. With the naval war the only significant front involving the British in the early months of the conflict, the First Lord's obvious desire to wage a ruthless, victorious war established him as a leader-in-waiting in the public consciousness and among parliamentary colleagues.

With little land action in the west, the initial months of the war were dubbed the "Bore War", later renamed the "Phoney War" by journalists. Chamberlain, in common with most Allied officials and generals, felt the war could be won relatively quickly by keeping economic pressure on Germany through a blockade while continuing rearmament. The Prime Minister was reluctant to go too far in altering the British economy. The government submitted an emergency war budget about which Chamberlain stated, "the only thing that matters is to win the war, though we may go bankrupt in the process." Government expenditures rose by little more than the rate of inflation between September 1939 and March 1940. Despite these difficulties, Chamberlain still enjoyed approval ratings as high as 68% and almost 60% in April 1940.

==== Downfall ====
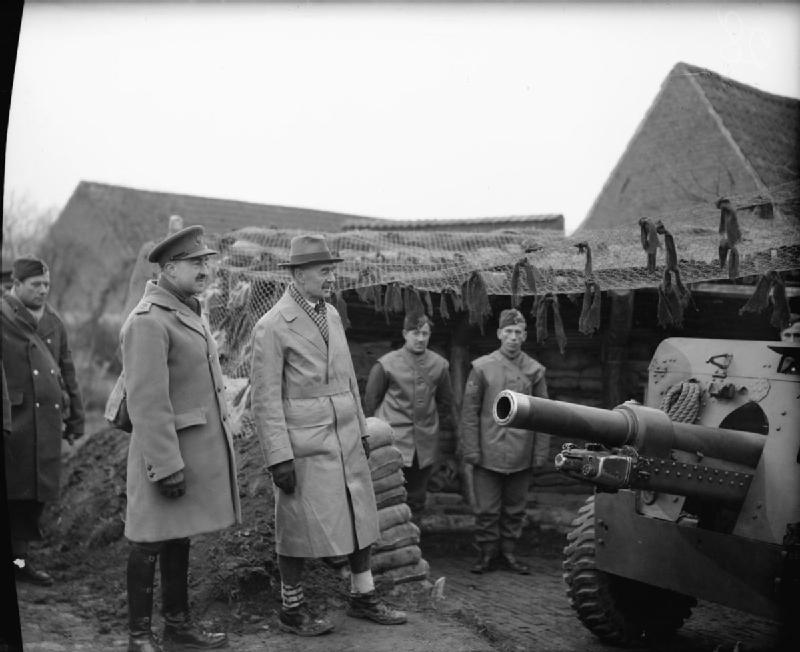
Chamberlain inspects a 25-pdr field gun at Bachy, 15 December 1939.

In early 1940 the Allies approved a naval campaign designed to seize the northern part of Norway, a neutral country, including the key port of Narvik, and possibly also to seize the iron mines at Gällivare in northern Sweden, from which Germany obtained much of its iron ore. As the Baltic froze in winter, the iron ore was then sent south by ship from Narvik. The Allies planned to begin by mining Norwegian waters, thus provoking a German reaction in Norway, and then would occupy much of the country. Unforeseen by the Allies, Germany had also planned to occupy Norway, and on 9 April German troops occupied Denmark and began an invasion of Norway. German forces quickly overran much of the country. The Allies sent troops to Norway, but they met with little success, and on 26 April the War Cabinet ordered a withdrawal. The Prime Minister's opponents decided to turn the adjournment debate for the Whitsun recess into a challenge to Chamberlain, who soon heard about the plan. After initial anger, Chamberlain determined to fight.

What became known as the "Norway Debate" opened on 7 May, and lasted for two days. The initial speeches, including Chamberlain's, were nondescript, but Admiral of the Fleet Roger Keyes, member for Portsmouth North, in full uniform, delivered a withering attack on the conduct of the Norway campaign, though he excluded Churchill from criticism. Leo Amery then delivered a speech which he concluded by echoing Oliver Cromwell's words on dissolving the Long Parliament: "You have sat here too long for any good you are doing. Depart, I say, and let us have done with you. In the name of God, go!" When Labour announced that they would call for a division of the House of Commons, Chamberlain called upon his "friends—and I still have some friends in this House—to support the Government tonight." Because the use of the word "friends" was a conventional term to refer to party colleagues, and, according to biographer Robert Self, many MPs took it that way, it was an "error of judgment" for Chamberlain to refer to party loyalty "when the gravity of the war situation required national unity." Lloyd George joined the attackers, and Churchill concluded the debate with a vigorous speech in support of the government. When the division took place, the government, which had a normal majority of over 200, prevailed by only 81, with 38 MPs in receipt of the government whip voting against it, with between 20 and 25 abstaining.

Chamberlain spent much of 9 May in meetings with his Cabinet colleagues. Many Conservative MPs, even those who had voted against the government, indicated on 9 May and in the days following that they did not wish Chamberlain to depart but rather would seek to reconstruct his government. Chamberlain decided that he would resign unless the Labour Party was willing to join his government, and so he met with Attlee later that day. Attlee was unwilling, but agreed to consult his National Executive then meeting in Bournemouth. Chamberlain favoured Halifax as the next prime minister, but Halifax proved reluctant to press his own claims thinking that his position in the House of Lords would limit his effectiveness in the House of Commons, and Churchill emerged as the choice. The following day, Germany invaded the Low Countries and Chamberlain considered remaining in office. Attlee confirmed that Labour would not serve under Chamberlain, though they were willing to serve under someone else. Accordingly, Chamberlain went to Buckingham Palace to resign and advise the King to send for Churchill. Churchill later expressed gratitude to Chamberlain for not advising the King to send for Halifax, who would have commanded the support of most government MPs. In a resignation broadcast that evening, Chamberlain told the nation,

Neville Chamberlain resigns
Neville Chamberlain speaks to the nation following his resignation as prime minister, 10 May 1940.

For the hour has now come when we are to be put to the test, as the innocent people of Holland, Belgium, and France are being tested already. And you and I must rally behind our new leader, and with our united strength, and with unshakable courage fight, and work until this wild beast, which has sprung out of his lair upon us, has been finally disarmed and overthrown.

Queen Elizabeth told Chamberlain that her daughter, Princess Elizabeth, wept as she heard the broadcast. Churchill wrote to express his gratitude for Chamberlain's willingness to stand by him in the nation's hour of need, and Baldwin, the only living former prime minister besides Chamberlain and Lloyd George, wrote, "You have passed through fire since we were talking together only a fortnight ago, and you have come out pure gold."

== Lord President of the Council ==
In a departure from usual practice, Chamberlain did not issue any resignation Honours list. With Chamberlain remaining leader of the Conservative Party, and with many MPs still supporting him and distrusting the new prime minister, Churchill refrained from any purge of Chamberlain loyalists. Churchill wished Chamberlain to return to the Exchequer, but he declined, convinced that this would lead to difficulties with the Labour Party. Instead, he accepted the post of Lord President of the Council with a seat in the shrunken five-member War Cabinet. When Chamberlain entered the House of Commons on 13 May 1940, for the first time since his resignation, "MPs lost their heads, they shouted, they cheered, they waved their order papers, and his reception was a regular ovation." The House received Churchill coolly; some of his great speeches to the chamber, such as "We shall fight on the beaches", met only half-hearted enthusiasm.

Chamberlain's fall from power left him deeply depressed; he wrote, "Few men can have known such a reversal of fortune in so short a time." He especially regretted the loss of Chequers as "a place where I have been so happy," though after a farewell visit there by the Chamberlains on 19 June, he wrote, "I am content now that I have done that, and shall put Chequers out of my mind." As lord president, Chamberlain assumed vast responsibilities over domestic issues and chaired the War Cabinet during Churchill's many absences. Attlee later remembered him as "free from any of the rancour he might have felt against us. He worked very hard and well: a good chairman, a good committeeman, always very businesslike." As chairman of the Lord President's Committee, he exerted great influence over the wartime economy. Halifax reported to the War Cabinet on 26 May 1940, with the Low Countries conquered and French prime minister Paul Reynaud warning that France might have to sign an armistice, that diplomatic contacts with a still-neutral Italy offered the possibility of a negotiated peace. Halifax urged following up and seeing if a worthwhile offer could be obtained. The battle over the course of action within the war cabinet lasted three days; Chamberlain's statement on the final day, that there was unlikely to be an acceptable offer and that the matter should not be pursued at that time, helped persuade the War Cabinet to reject negotiations.

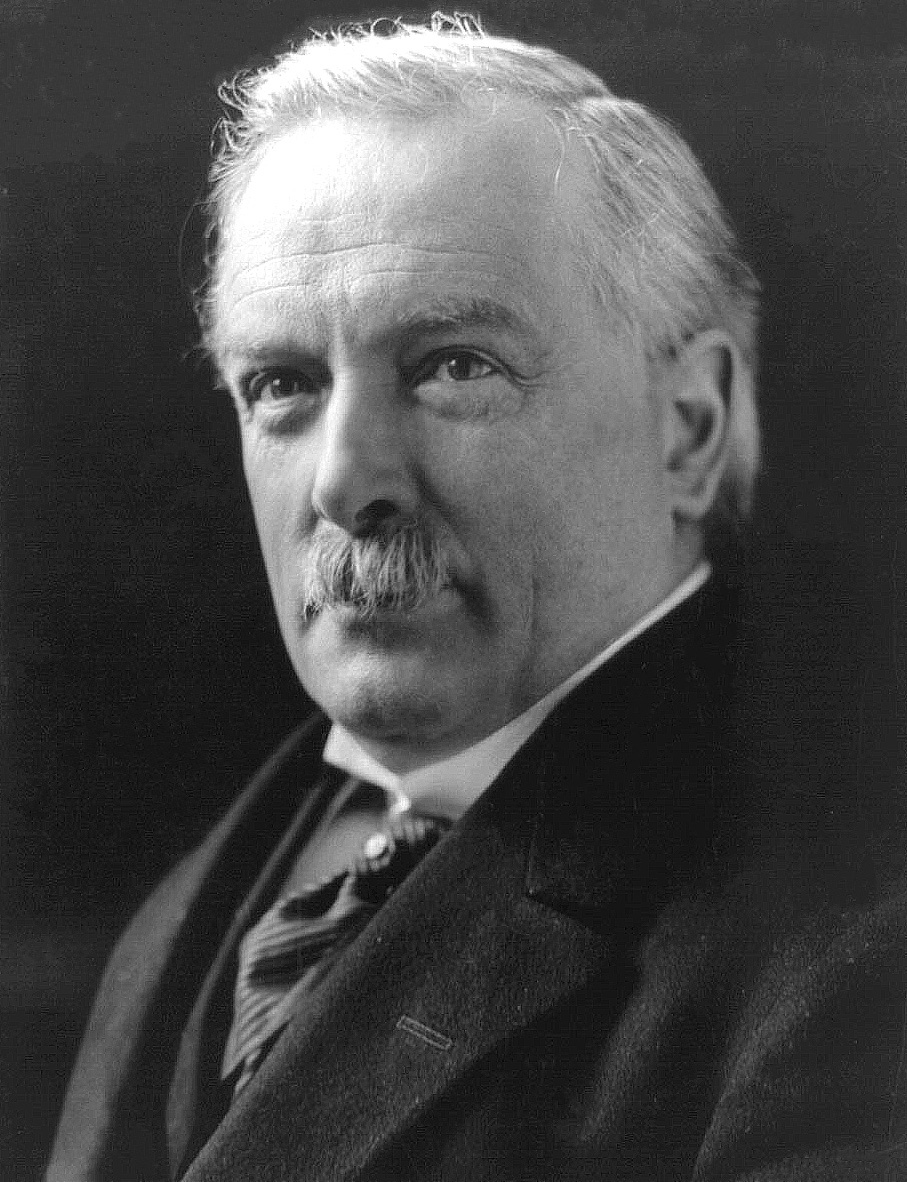
David Lloyd George, prime minister 1916–22, whose contempt for Chamberlain was reciprocated

Twice in May 1940, Churchill broached the subject of bringing Lloyd George into the government. Each time, Chamberlain indicated that due to their longtime antipathy he would immediately retire if Lloyd George were appointed a minister. Churchill did not appoint Lloyd George, but brought up the subject with Chamberlain again early in June. This time, Chamberlain agreed to Lloyd George's appointment provided Lloyd George gave a personal assurance to put aside the feud. Lloyd George declined to serve in Churchill's government.

Chamberlain worked to bring his Conservative Party in line behind Churchill, working with the Chief Whip, David Margesson, to overcome members' suspicions and dislikes of the Prime Minister. On 4 July, after the British attack on the French fleet, Churchill entered the chamber to a great cheer from Conservative MPs orchestrated by the two, and the Prime Minister was almost overcome with emotion at the first cheer he had received from his own party's benches since May. Churchill returned the loyalty, refusing to consider Labour and Liberal attempts to expel Chamberlain from the government. When criticisms of Chamberlain appeared in the press, and when Chamberlain learned that Labour intended to use an upcoming secret session of Parliament as a platform to attack him, he told Churchill that he could only defend himself by attacking Labour. The Prime Minister intervened with the Labour Party and the press and the criticism ceased, according to Chamberlain, "like turning off a tap".

In July 1940 a polemic titled Guilty Men was released by "Cato"—a pseudonym for three journalists (the future Labour leader Michael Foot, the former Liberal MP Frank Owen and the Conservative Peter Howard). It attacked the record of the National Government, alleging that it had failed to prepare adequately for war. It called for the removal of Chamberlain and other ministers who had allegedly contributed to the British disasters of the early part of the war. The short book sold more than 200,000 copies, many of which were passed from hand-to-hand, and went into 27 editions in the first few months, despite not being carried by several major bookshops. According to the historian David Dutton, "its impact upon Chamberlain's reputation, both among the general public and within the academic world, was profound indeed."

Chamberlain had long enjoyed excellent health, except for occasional attacks of gout, but by July 1940 he was in almost constant pain. He sought treatment, and later that month entered hospital for surgery. Surgeons discovered that he was suffering from terminal bowel cancer, but they concealed it from him, instead telling him that he would not require further surgery. Chamberlain resumed work in mid-August. He returned to his office on 9 September, but renewed pain, compounded by the night-time bombing of London which forced him to go to an air raid shelter and denied him rest, sapped his energy, and he left London for the last time on 19 September, returning to Highfield Park in Heckfield. Chamberlain offered his resignation to Churchill on 22 September 1940. The Prime Minister was initially reluctant to accept, but as both men realised that Chamberlain would never return to work, Churchill finally allowed him to resign. The Prime Minister asked if Chamberlain would accept the highest order of British chivalry, the Order of the Garter, of which his brother had been a member. Chamberlain refused, saying he would "prefer to die plain 'Mr Chamberlain' like my father before me, unadorned by any title."

In the short time remaining to him, Chamberlain was angered by the "short, cold and for the most part depreciatory" press comments on his retirement, according to him written "without the slightest sign of sympathy for the man or even any comprehension that there may be a human tragedy in the background." The King and Queen drove down from Windsor to visit the dying man on 14 October. Chamberlain received hundreds of sympathetic letters from friends and supporters. He wrote to John Simon, who had served as Chancellor of the Exchequer in Chamberlain's government:

[I]t was the hope of doing something to improve the conditions of life for the poorer people that brought me at past middle life into politics, and it is some satisfaction to me that I was able to carry out some part of my ambition even though its permanency may be challenged by the destruction of war. For the rest I regret nothing that I have done & I can see nothing undone that I ought to have done. I am therefore content to accept the fate that has so suddenly overtaken me.

== Death ==
The burial place of Neville Chamberlain in Westminster Abbey.

Chamberlain died of bowel cancer on 9 November 1940 in Heckfield at the age of 71. A funeral service took place at Westminster Abbey five days later on Thursday 14 November. Due to wartime security concerns, the date and time were not widely publicised. Chamberlain's former private secretary John Colville functioned as the service's usher, while both Churchill and Halifax acted as pallbearers. After cremation, his ashes were interred in the Abbey next to those of Bonar Law. Churchill eulogised Chamberlain in the Commons three days after his death:

Whatever else history may or may not say about these terrible, tremendous years, we can be sure that Neville Chamberlain acted with perfect sincerity according to his lights and strove to the utmost of his capacity and authority, which were powerful, to save the world from the awful, devastating struggle in which we are now engaged. This alone will stand him in good stead as far as what is called the verdict of history is concerned.

Although some Chamberlain supporters found Churchill's oratory to be faint praise, Churchill added less publicly, "Whatever shall I do without poor Neville? I was relying on him to look after the Home Front for me." Amongst others who paid tribute to Chamberlain in the Commons and the Lords on 12 November 1940 were the Foreign Secretary, Halifax; the Labour leader, Attlee; and the Liberal leader and Air Minister, Archibald Sinclair. Lloyd George, the only former prime minister remaining in the Commons, had been expected to speak, but absented himself from the proceedings. Ever close to his family, the executors of Chamberlain's will were his cousins, Wilfred Byng Kenrick and Wilfrid Martineau, both of whom, like Chamberlain, were lord mayors of Birmingham.

== Legacy and reputation ==
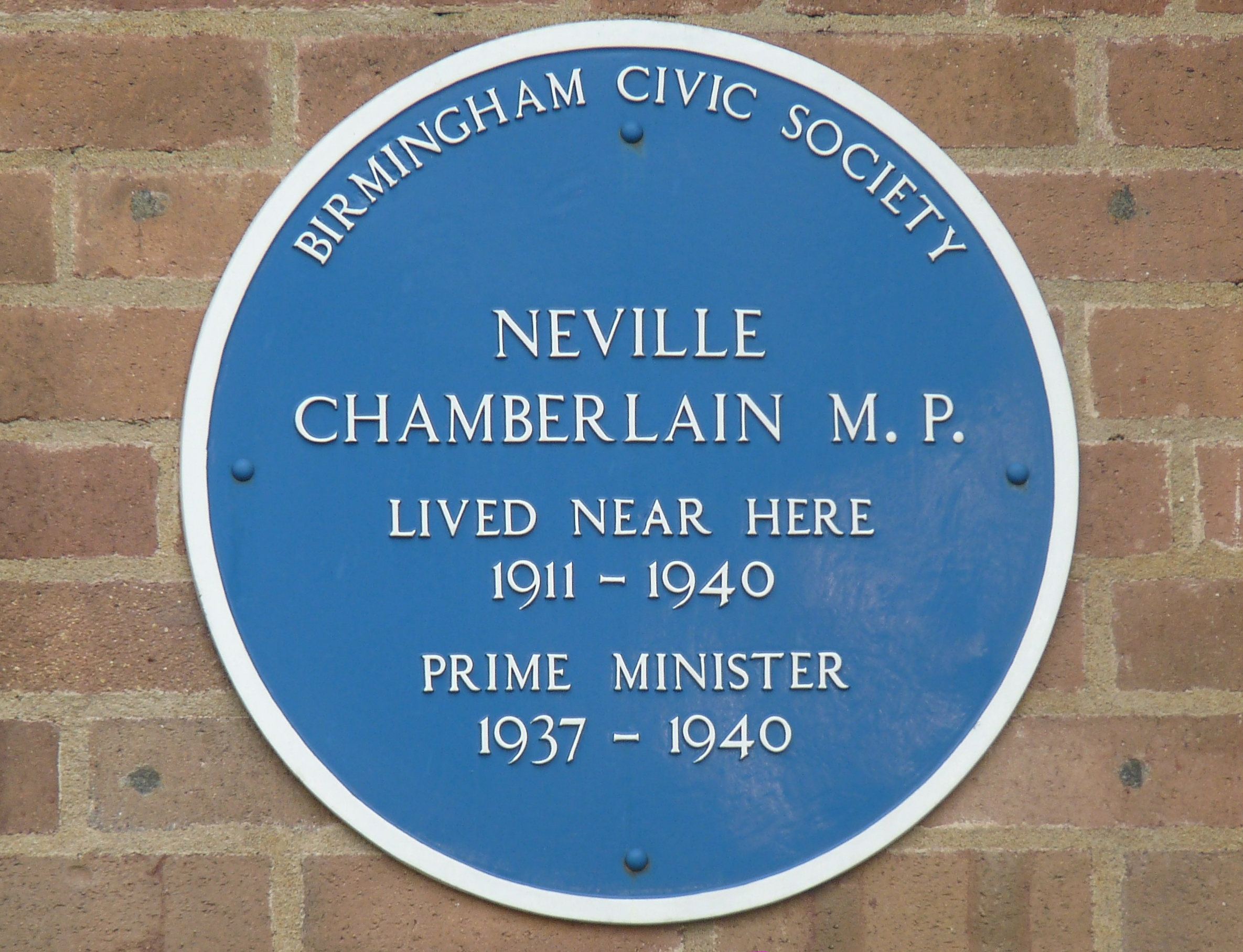
Blue plaque honouring Chamberlain, Edgbaston, Birmingham

A few days before his death, Chamberlain wrote,

So far as my personal reputation is concerned, I am not in the least disturbed about it. The letters which I am still receiving in such vast quantities so unanimously dwell on the same point, namely without Munich the war would have been lost and the Empire destroyed in 1938 ... I do not feel the opposite view ... has a chance of survival. Even if nothing further were to be published giving the true inside story of the past two years I should not fear the historian's verdict.

Guilty Men was not the only Second World War tract that damaged Chamberlain's reputation. We Were Not All Wrong, published in 1941, took a similar tack to Guilty Men, arguing that Liberal and Labour MPs, and a small number of Conservatives, had fought against Chamberlain's appeasement policies. The author, the Liberal MP Geoffrey Mander, had voted against conscription in 1939. Another polemic against Conservative policies was Why Not Trust the Tories (1944, written by "Gracchus", who was later revealed to be the future Labour minister Aneurin Bevan), which castigated the Conservatives for the foreign policy decisions of Baldwin and Chamberlain. Though a few Conservatives offered their own versions of events, most notably the MP Quintin Hogg in his 1945 The Left Was Never Right, by the end of the war, there was a very strong public belief that Chamberlain was culpable for serious diplomatic and military misjudgements that had nearly caused Britain's defeat.

Chamberlain's reputation was devastated by these attacks from the left. In 1948, with the publication of The Gathering Storm, the first volume of Churchill's six-volume set, The Second World War, Chamberlain sustained an even more serious assault from the right. While Churchill stated privately, "this is not history, this is my case", his series was still hugely influential. Churchill depicted Chamberlain as well-meaning but weak, blind to the threat posed by Hitler, and oblivious to the fact that (according to Churchill) Hitler could have been removed from power by a grand coalition of European states. Churchill suggested that the year's delay between Munich and war worsened Britain's position, and criticised Chamberlain for both peacetime and wartime decisions. In the years following the publication of Churchill's books, few historians questioned his judgment.

Anne Chamberlain, the former premier's widow, suggested that Churchill's work was filled with matters that "are not real misstatements that could easily be corrected, but wholesale omissions and assumptions that certain things are now recognised as facts which actually have no such position".

Many of Chamberlain's family letters and his extensive personal papers were bequeathed by his family in 1974 to the Birmingham University Archives. During the war, the Chamberlain family had commissioned the historian Keith Feiling to produce an official biography, and gave him access to Chamberlain's private diaries and papers. While Feiling had the right of access to official papers as the official biographer of a recently deceased person, he may not have been aware of the provision, and the Cabinet Secretary denied his requests for access.

Though Feiling produced what the historian David Dutton described in 2001 as "the most impressive and persuasive single-volume biography" of Chamberlain (completed during the war and published in 1946), he could not repair the damage already done to Chamberlain's reputation.

The Conservative MP Iain Macleod's 1961 biography of Chamberlain was the first major biography of a revisionist school of thought on Chamberlain. The same year, A. J. P. Taylor, in his The Origins of the Second World War, found that Chamberlain had adequately rearmed Britain for defence (though a rearmament designed to defeat Germany would have taken massive additional resources) and described Munich as "a triumph for all that was best and most enlightened in British life ... [and] for those who had courageously denounced the harshness and short-sightedness of Versailles".

The adoption of the "thirty-year rule" in 1967 made available many of the papers of the Chamberlain government over the subsequent three years, helping to explain why Chamberlain acted as he did. The resultant works greatly fuelled the revisionist school, although they also included books that strongly criticised Chamberlain, such as Keith Middlemas's 1972 Diplomacy of Illusion (which portrayed Chamberlain as a seasoned politician with strategic blindness when it came to Germany). Released papers indicated that, contrary to claims made in Guilty Men, Chamberlain had neither ignored the advice of the Foreign Office nor had he disregarded and run roughshod over his Cabinet. Other released papers showed that Chamberlain had considered seeking a grand coalition amongst European governments like that later advocated by Churchill, but had rejected it on the grounds that the division of Europe into two camps would make war more, not less, likely. They also showed that Chamberlain had been advised that the Dominions, pursuing independent foreign policies under the Statute of Westminster, had indicated that Chamberlain could not depend on their help in the event of a Continental war. The Chiefs of Staff report, which indicated that Britain could not forcibly prevent Germany from conquering Czechoslovakia, was first publicly known at this time. In reaction to the revisionist school of thought regarding Chamberlain a post-revisionist school emerged beginning in the 1990s, using the released papers to justify the initial conclusions of Guilty Men. The Oxford historian R. A. C. Parker argued that Chamberlain could have forged a close alliance with France after the Anschluss, in early 1938, and begun a policy of containment of Germany under the auspices of the League of Nations. While many revisionist writers had suggested that Chamberlain had had few or no choices in his actions, Parker argued that Chamberlain and his colleagues had chosen appeasement over other viable policies. In his two volumes, Chamberlain and Appeasement (1993) and Churchill and Appeasement (2000), Parker stated that Chamberlain, due to his "powerful, obstinate personality" and his skill in debate, caused Britain to embrace appeasement instead of effective deterrence. Parker also suggested that had Churchill held high office in the second half of the 1930s Churchill would have built a series of alliances which would have deterred Hitler, and perhaps would have caused Hitler's domestic opponents to procure his removal.

Dutton observes that Chamberlain's reputation, for good or ill, will probably always be closely tied to evaluation of his policy toward Germany:

Whatever else may be said of Chamberlain's public life his reputation will in the last resort depend upon assessments of this moment [Munich] and this policy [appeasement]. This was the case when he left office in 1940 and it remains so sixty years later. To expect otherwise is rather like hoping that Pontius Pilate will one day be judged as a successful provincial administrator of the Roman Empire.

== Honours ==
=== Academic honours ===
- Fellow of the Royal Society (FRS) – 1938
- Oxford University – DCL
- University of Cambridge – LLD
- Birmingham University – LLD
- Bristol University – LLD
- Leeds University – LLD
- University of Reading – DLitt

=== Freedoms ===
- Honorary Freedom City of Birmingham
- Honorary Freedom City of London – conferred 1940 but died before acceptance, the scroll being presented to his widow in 1941

=== Honorary military appointments ===
- 1939: Honorary Air Commodore, No 916 (County of Warwick) Balloon Squadron, Auxiliary Air Force

== Arms ==
Coat of arms of Neville Chamberlain
Crest On a wreath of the colours, issuing from the battlements of a tower a demi-lion proper, holding between the paws a key erect or. Escutcheon Gules, a key in bend between two lions rampant or. Motto "Je tiens ferme." (I stand firm). Other versions The 1899 edition of Fox-Davies's Armorial families gives the Chamberlains' arms as Gules, eight cinquefoils in orle or but says that "no authority has been established" for these arms." The arms described above were officially granted.

== Parliamentary election results ==
General election 1918: Birmingham Ladywood (new seat)
Party	Candidate	Votes	%	±%
Conservative	Neville Chamberlain	9,405	69.5	
Labour	John Kneeshaw	2,572	19.0	
Liberal	Margery Corbett Ashby	1,552	11.5	
Majority		6,833	50.5	
Turnout		13,529	40.6	

General election 1922: Birmingham Ladywood
Party	Candidate	Votes	%	±%
Conservative	Neville Chamberlain	13,032	55.2	−14.3
Labour	Robert Dunstan	10,589	44.8	25.8
Majority		2,443	10.4	−40.1
Turnout		23,621	71.1	+30.5
Conservative hold		Swing	-15.6	

General election 1923: Birmingham Ladywood
Party	Candidate	Votes	%	±%
Conservative	Neville Chamberlain	12,884	53.2	−2.0
Labour	Robert Dunstan	11,330	46.8	2.0
Majority		1,554	6.4	−4.0
Turnout		24,214	72.0	+0.9
Conservative hold		Swing	-2.0	

General election 1924: Birmingham Ladywood
Party	Candidate	Votes	%	±%
Conservative	Neville Chamberlain	13,374	49.1	−4.1
Labour	Oswald Mosley	13,297	48.9	2.1
Liberal	Alfred William Bowkett	539	2.0	2.0
Majority		77	0.2	−3.8
Turnout		27,200	80.5	+8.5
Conservative hold		Swing	-3.1	

General election 1929: Birmingham Edgbaston
Party	Candidate	Votes	%	±%
Conservative	Neville Chamberlain	23,350	63.7	−12.9
Labour	William Henry Dashwood Caple	8,590	23.4	0.0
Liberal	Percy Reginald Coombs Young	4,720	12.9	12.9
Majority		14,760	40.3	−12.9
Turnout		36,166	70.0	+5.1
Conservative hold		Swing	-6.5	

General election 1931: Birmingham Edgbaston
Party	Candidate	Votes	%	±%
Conservative	Neville Chamberlain	33,085	86.5	22.8
Labour	W.W. Blaylock	5,157	13.5	−9.9
Majority		27,928	73.0	−40.1
Turnout		38,242	70.9	+0.9
Conservative hold		Swing	+16.4	

General election 1935: Birmingham Edgbaston
Party	Candidate	Votes	%	±%
Conservative	Neville Chamberlain	28,243	81.6	−4.9
Labour	Jerrold Adshead	6,381	18.4	4.9
Majority		21,862	63.2	−9.8
Turnout		34,624	62.4	+8.5
Conservative hold		Swing	-4.9	

== Notes ==
=== Citations ===
Parliament of the United Kingdom
New constituency	Member of Parliament for Birmingham Ladywood; 1918–1929	Succeeded by Wilfrid Whiteley
Preceded by Francis Lowe	Member of Parliament for Birmingham Edgbaston; 1929–1940	Succeeded by Peter Bennett
Political offices
Preceded by Frederick Kellaway	Postmaster General; 1922–1923	Succeeded by William Joynson-Hicks
Preceded by Tudor Walters	Paymaster General; 1923	Succeeded by William Joynson-Hicks
Preceded by Arthur Griffith-Boscawen	Minister for Health; 1923	Succeeded by William Joynson-Hicks
Preceded by Stanley Baldwin	Chancellor of the Exchequer; 1923–1924	Succeeded by Philip Snowden
Preceded by John Wheatley	Minister for Health; 1924–1929	Succeeded by Arthur Greenwood
Preceded by Arthur Greenwood	Minister for Health; 1931	Succeeded by Hilton Young
Preceded by Philip Snowden	Chancellor of the Exchequer; 1931–1937	Succeeded by John Simon
Preceded by Stanley Baldwin	Prime Minister of the United Kingdom; First Lord of the Treasury; Leader of the House of Commons; 1937–1940	Succeeded by Winston Churchill
Preceded by The Earl Stanhope	Lord President of the Council; 1940	Succeeded by John Anderson
Party political offices
Preceded by J. C. C. Davidson	Chairman of the Conservative Party; 1930–1931	Succeeded by The Lord Stonehaven
Preceded by Stanley Baldwin	Leader of the Conservative Party; 1937–1940	Succeeded by Winston Churchill
