= Lucy Gertrude Moberly =

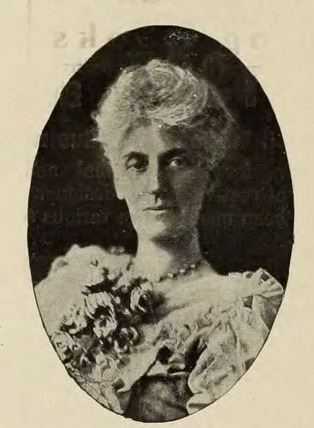
- Born: Lucia Gertrude Moberly; December 24, 1860; Winchester
- Died: March 20, 1931; London
- Occupations: Writer, poet
- Father: Henry Moberly

Lucy Gertrude Moberly (December 24, 1860 – March 20, 1931) was a British novelist.

L. G. Moberly was born in 1860 in Winchester, Hampshire, the daughter of Henry Edward Moberly, Vicar of Heckfield, and Lucy Proby Chase Moberly. She trained to be a nurse but spent most of her life as a professional writer, authoring fifty seven novels, mostly sensational romances.

Moberly’s shorter work includes a series of stories about Dr. Cynthia Deane called Experiences of a Lady Doctor, which appeared in The Lady's Magazine in 1903. Her short story "Inexplicable", about a house filled with alligators, appeared in The Strand in 1917. Sigmund Freud mentioned the story in his essay "Uncanny", writing that it was "a naïve enough story, but the uncanny feeling it produced was quite remarkable." Her poem "Commandeered", about horses serving in World War I, originally appeared in the Westminster Gazette. It was included in a number of WWI anthologies and was adopted by Our Dumb Friends' League.

L. G. Moberly died on 20 March 1931 in London.

== Bibliography ==
- Sick Nursing at Home. Scient. Press, 1899.
- A Great Patience. London: S. W. Partridge, 1902.
- Hope, My Wife. London: Ward, Lock, 1906.
- That Preposterous Will. London: Ward, Lock, 1906.
- Dan and Another. London: Ward, Lock, 1907.
- Diana. London: Ward, Lock, 1907.
- Angela's Marriage. London: Ward, Lock, 1908.
- A Tangled Web. London: Ward, Lock, 1908.
- The Sin of Alison Dering. London: Ward, Lock, 1909.
- A Very Doubtful Experiment. London: Ward, Lock, 1909.
- A Woman Against the World. London: Ward, Lock, 1909.
- In the Balance. London: Ward, Lock, 1910.
- Joy. London: Ward, Lock, 1910.
- A Waif of Destiny. London: Ward, Lock, 1910.
- The Cost. London: Mills and Boon, 1911.
- Fortune's Foundling. London: Ward, Lock, 1911.
- Heart of Gold. London: Ward, Lock, 1911.
- Phyllis. London: Ward, Lock, 1911.
- Christina. London: Ward, Lock, 1912.
- His Little Girl. London: Ward, Lock, 1912.
- Violet Dunstan. London: Ward, Lock, 1912.
- Until Seventy Times Seven. London: Ward, Lock, 1913.
- Cleansing Fires. London: Ward, Lock, 1914.
- Man and Woman. London: Methuen, 1914.
- After Long Years. London: Ward, Lock, 1915.
- The Highway. London: Methuen, 1915.
- Maid Marjory. London: Ward, Lock, 1916.
- Second Bests: A Thing of Shreds and Patches. London: Mills and Boon, 1916.
- The Little Old Man with the Tired Face. Toronto: Warwick and Butler, 1917.
- The Key of Gold. London: Ward, Lock, 1918.
- Sunshine All the Way. London: Ward, Lock, 1918.
- Vere. London: Ward, Lock, 1920.
- Barbara. London: Ward, Lock, 1921.
- Undying Music. London: Ward, Lock, 1922.
- A Year at the Outside. London: Ward, Lock, 1923.
- Rosemary Book. R. T. S., 1923.
- A Man's Whim. London: Ward, Lock, 1924.
- A Leap in the Dark. London: Ward, Lock, 1925.
- Eve Mistaken. London: Ward, Lock, 1924.
- For Another's Sake. London: Ward, Lock, 1925.
- Wheels Within Wheels. London: Ward, Lock, 1925.
- Captain of Her School. London: Ward, Lock, 1926.
- In Apple Blossom Time. London: Ward, Lock, 1926.
- Scape Goat of Circumstances. London: Ward, Lock, 1926.
- Who Was She. London: Ward, Lock, 1926.
