= Horace Wilson (civil servant) =

British government official and civil servant

Sir Horace Wilson GCB GCMG CBE

Head of the Home Civil Service
- In office 1939–1942
- Monarch: George VI
- Prime Minister: Neville Chamberlain; Winston Churchill
- Preceded by: Sir Warren Fisher
- Succeeded by: Sir Richard Hopkins

Personal details
- Born: 23 August 1882 Bournemouth, England
- Died: 19 May 1972 (aged 89) Bournemouth, England
- Education: London School of Economics

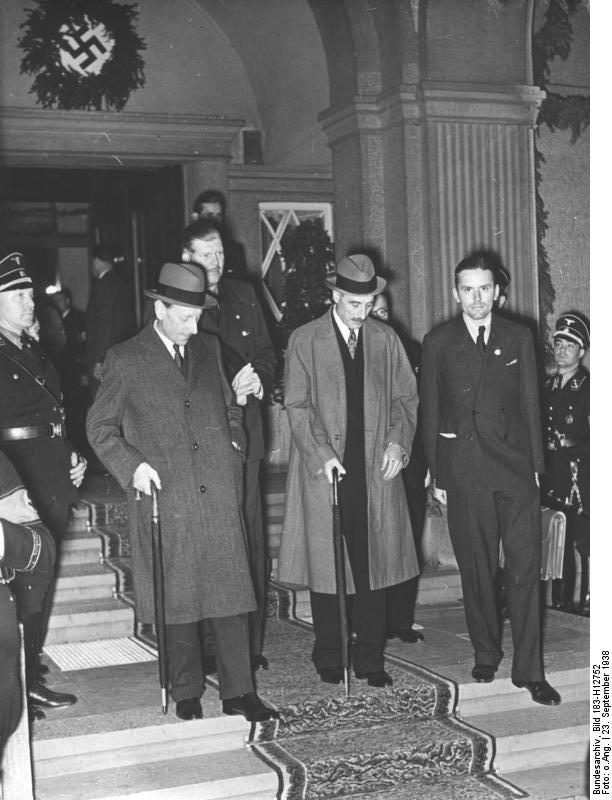
Sir Horace Wilson on 23 September 1938, along with the British Ambassador to Germany, Nevile Henderson

Sir Horace John Wilson, GCB, GCMG, CBE (23 August 1882 – 19 May 1972) was a senior British government official who had a key role, as Head of the Home Civil Service, with the government of Prime Minister Neville Chamberlain in the appeasement period just prior to the Second World War.

== Early life and career ==
Son of furniture dealer Henry Wilson and Elizabeth Ann Smith, Horace John Wilson was born in Bournemouth on 23 August 1882. For his education he attended Kurnella School in the town before graduating to the London School of Economics.

Joining the old Second Division of the British Civil Service in 1900, his abilities came to the notice of senior officials. During the First World War, in 1915, Wilson was made secretary to the Committee on Production and the Special Arbitration Tribunal. At the end of hostilities in 1918 Wilson moved to the new Ministry of Labour as part of the Conciliation Department. There he worked alongside David Shackleton. He was appointed Permanent Secretary to the ministry in 1921. It was at this time he developed a reputation for resolving industrial disputes, a high point in this regard was his handling of the cotton crisis on 1929. One great asset brought to bear in the arbitration of the disputes was reportedly his adherence to impartiality which was trusted by both employers and employees alike. Success with the ministry caused Wilson to be appointed Chief Industrial Advisor to the Government in 1930 by Prime Minister Ramsay MacDonald. Wilson's reorganisation of the cotton industry in Britain was the highlight of this part of his career.

At this point Wilson was to display his abilities on the international stage when travelling to the Imperial Economic Conference in Ottawa, Canada. Wilson was the most senior official travelling with the British delegation to the conference. There he impressed with his grasp of the subject and was said to have been largely responsible for the agreements reached at the conference. He returned from Canada to an appointment as a Knight Grand Cross of the Order of St Michael and St George.

Wilson's career saw several official awards. He was made a Commander of the Order of the British Empire (CBE) in the 1918 New Year Honours, Companion of the Order of the Bath (CB) in the 1920 Birthday Honours, Knight Commander of the Order of the Bath (KCB) in the 1924 Birthday Honours, Knight Grand Cross of the Order of St Michael and St George (GCMG) in the 1933 New Year Honours, and finally Knight Grand Cross of the Order of the Bath (GCB) in the 1937 Coronation Honours. Under the Premiership of Stanley Baldwin, in 1935, Wilson was afforded a secondment described as 'for service with the Prime Minister'. This continued with the ascent of Neville Chamberlain to the office in 1937.

Lord Woolton recalled in his memoir that Wilson, "found himself enjoying tremendous power – in fact a power unequalled by any member of the Cabinet except the Prime Minister." On another occasion Woolton noted that Wilson left him after a dinner early saying, "I must go and look after my master: he's feeling very lonely just now". He was described as “having a more powerful position in Britain than anybody since Cardinal Wolsey”. Indeed, Chamberlain's biographer Robert Self noted that the men "enjoyed the sort of unparalleled intimacy only possible among truly kindred spirits."

== Appeasement ==
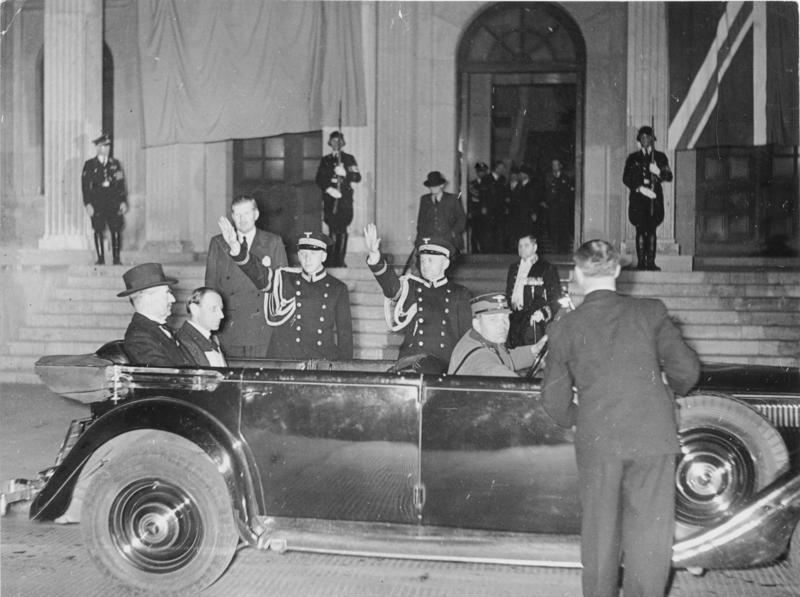
Sir Horace Wilson alongside Neville Chamberlain in a car, Godesburg, 22 or 23 September 1938

10 March 1938 saw Wilson meet with Theodor Kordt, the counsellor at Germany's London Embassy. Wilson stated his pleasure at hearing that Adolf Hitler had referred to England and Germany as "two pillars upon which the European social order could rest". Wilson expanded the metaphor by expressing his wish "that an arch of co-operation should be erected on these two pillars". He also expressed his hope that Germany would succeed in fulfilling her goals regarding Austria and Czechoslovakia "as much as possible without the use of force".

In June Wilson went further, intimating to Helmuth Wohlthat of the German Ministry of Economics, that Britain was prepared to recognise German economic dominance in central Europe. Furthermore, Britain would also accept the transfer of the Sudetenland from Czechoslovakia to Germany. However, in exchange for this recognition Hitler would need to state the limits of Germany's territorial ambitions.

August ended with Lord Halifax sending a letter from Winston Churchill to Wilson on the 31st. It suggested a joint declaration by Britain, France and the Soviet Union calling for a peaceful solution to the crisis. However, Wilson counselled Chamberlain against the inclusion of the Russians as he felt this would anger the Fuhrer and take away any benefit a declaration may bring. Wilson went further still, stating that he doubted the ability of Britain, France and Russia to act militarily against Germany. Furthermore, that if it came to military action, Britain would to all intents and purposes be attacking alone.

Kordt returned to Downing Street in early September but on this occasion as a member of the German resistance to Hitler. Kordt had already urged Wilson on August 23 that Britain must speak and act with clarity on the matter. Now he came with specific intelligence that Hitler would invade Czechoslovakia on September 19 or 20 as he felt France would not honour its pledge to the Czechs. Kordt urged Wilson that Chamberlain should broadcast to Germany and state unequivocally that Britain would assist the Czechs in resisting a Nazi invasion. Moved by the request Wilson asked Kordt to come back the following day to say the same to Halifax and Cadogan. It was they who vetoed the idea as they felt it would preclude the possibility of a peaceful solution to the crisis. According to Kordt, Wilson stated that Russia could be left out of any European settlement as "in his opinion the system there was bound 'to melt away' some day".

On 15 September 1938, Prime Minister Chamberlain left for Germany to negotiate with Hitler regarding the disputed territory of the Sudetenland. He was accompanied on this mission by Wilson in what was his first diplomatic mission. Sir Harold Nicolson described the pair and their mission as "the bright faithfulness of two curates entering a pub for the first time".

While he travelled with Wilson to meet Hitler during the crisis, Chamberlain still consulted the inner cabinet (Lord Halifax, Sir John Simon and Sir Samuel Hoare) on the matter as well as meetings of the full cabinet.

Wilson travelled with the Prime Minister to three meetings with Hitler, but also travelled to see the Fuhrer alone on 26 September.

His lone mission on 26 September to see Hitler followed the German leader issuing his Godesberg ultimatum to Czechoslovakia regarding the ceding of the Sudetenland to Nazi Germany. Wilson carried with him a letter from Chamberlain. It proposed direct negotiations between Germany and Czechoslovakia and His Majesty's Government would act for the Czechs if both parties agreed. Wilson was unable to deliver the second part of the message due to Hitler being in a bad mood, which left him impatient and irritable. Returning the following day, Wilson was able to complete his task, stating "if, in the pursuit of her treaty obligations, France became actively engaged in hostilities against Germany, the United Kingdom would feel obliged to support her".

In July 1939, Wilson took part in Anglo-German talks in London. Helmuth Wohlthat, a German government official was in London for a whaling conference. Wilson invited Wohlthat to a meeting in which Wilson presented a memorandum outlining a possible agreement between the United Kingdom and Nazi Germany. The paper proposed a joint declaration to abstain from aggression, arms limits, and economic cooperation. As Wohlthat left he reported Wilson as saying that "he saw the possibility of a common foreign and trade policy for the two greatest European states". Feeling himself too junior an official for such matters, Wohlthat reported to his superiors and asked what should be the reply. No reply has been found to that question.

Wilson also liaised with the press, meeting newspaper owners to gain support for appeasement. He also warned the BBC to exercise self-censorship in relation to Germany.

Wilson was referred to in the book Guilty Men by Michael Foot, Frank Owen and Peter Howard (writing under the pseudonym 'Cato'), published in 1940 as an attack on public figures for their failure to re-arm and their appeasement of Nazi Germany. Wilson later stated in 1962 that, "Our policy was never designed just to postpone war, or enable us to enter war more united. The aim of our appeasement was to avoid war altogether, for all time."

== Later career and retirement ==
Just after the outbreak of war, John Colville joined the Downing Street staff as Chamberlain's Private Secretary in October 1939. Colville noted that Chamberlain seldom took action without Wilson's advice. Colville also felt that "he came to believe himself as infallible as the prime minister thought him to be". Labour Party leader Clement Attlee also commented that during Chamberlain's premiership Wilson "had a hand in everything, ran everything". However, Chamberlain's sister Hilda observed that her brother used Wilson purely as a messenger and knew his own mind. Wilson himself refuted the idea that he exercised power and felt himself to be merely a "chopping block" for the Prime Minister's ideas.

Sources vary on specifics, but when Winston Churchill became prime minister Wilson was threatened with the governorship of Greenland (or Iceland) should Churchill see him at Downing Street again. Some sources have this occurring on the day of the accession, 10 May 1940, while others give 11 May. There is also some disagreement as to whether it was Churchill's son Randolph and Brendan Bracken who made the remark or a quip by Churchill himself.

Wilson reverted to his role as Permanent Secretary to the Treasury until August 1942 when he retired, having reached the age of 60, then the pensionable age for the Civil Service. In January 1944 Wilson was appointed by the Minister of Health to act as Chairman of the National Joint Council for Local Authorities' Administrative, Professional, Technical and Clerical Services. The council was engaged in matters of pay and conditions of those in local government as well as supervision of recruitment and training provision.

Wilson spoke at a 1957 meeting in support of Nigel Nicolson MP, for the constituency of Bournemouth East and Christchurch, when the local constituency part moved to deselect him over disagreements about the Suez Crisis. Wilson told the meeting that "he was against all subservience and dictators, and all for freedom in thought and speech – even if it meant an independence which might annoy some of those in power at headquarters or locally".

British journalist Leonard Mosley interviewed Wilson among numerous others for the 1969 book On Borrowed Time, about the months leading up to the outbreak of World War II. Wilson acknowledged having felt out of his depth in dealing with Nazi Germany, while Mosley remained critical of Wilson's role. It has also been reported that he showed little interest in the fate of Germany's Jews during the negotiations with Hitler. Speaking to another journalist, Colin Cross, in 1968, 23 years after end of the war, Wilson is quoted as saying that he understood Hitler's feelings about the Jews. "Have you ever met a Jew you liked?" he asked Cross.

Wilson died in Bournemouth on 19 May 1972.

== In fiction ==
Wilson is a key character in Michael Dobbs' novel Winston's War. In the book Wilson is portrayed as an arch-manipulator who has the telephones of all potential enemies to Neville Chamberlain tapped and will use any methods he can to get rid of Winston Churchill.

Wilson also appears in Jean-Paul Sartre's novel The Reprieve.

Wilson is something of a MacGuffin in the alternative history writings of Harry Turtledove. In both the Southern Victory Series and The War That Came Early series, Wilson serves as Prime Minister for part of an analog of World War II.

In the TV mini-series Winston Churchill: The Wilderness Years (1981) Wilson is depicted by the actor Clive Swift. This film is technically "fiction" though it adheres closely to historical facts and was made with input from professional historian and biographer Martin Gilbert. The film shows Wilson holding enormous (and malign) influence in the ramp-up to war in the 1930s. A pivotal sequence of the film shows Neville Chamberlain (played by Eric Porter) and Wilson having a late-night meeting, in Wilson's office, about Wilson expanding his role in the government and becoming Chamberlain's right-hand man. Wilson does not explicitly ask for much but cannily steers Chamberlain toward what he wants.

Wilson also features in Munich by Robert Harris. The book is a fiction story but set against the real Munich Conference in 1938. In the 2021 movie Munich - The Edge of War based on the book by Harris, Wilson is portrayed by Alex Jennings.

Government offices
Preceded by Sir David Shackleton and Sir James Masterton-Smith	Permanent Secretary of the Ministry of Labour; 1921–1930	Succeeded by Sir Francis Floud
Preceded by Sir Warren Fisher	Head of the Home Civil Service & Permanent Secretary to the Treasury; 1939–1942	Succeeded by Sir Richard Hopkins
