= Henry Moberly =

English cricketer, cleric, and school housemaster

- Born: Henry Edward Moberly; 11 December 1822; Madras, British India
- Died: 22 September 1907 (aged 84)
- Education: Winchester College
- Alma mater: New College, Oxford
- Children: Lucy Gertrude Moberly

Ecclesiastical career
- Religion: Anglicanism
- Church: Church of England
- Ordained: 1846 (deacon); 1851 (priest)
- Offices held: Vicar of Heckfield; Rector of St Michael's, Winchester
- Cricket career

Cricket information

Domestic team information
- Years: Team
- 1842-1845: Oxford University Cricket Club

Career statistics
Competition	First-class cricket
Matches	10
Runs scored	153
Batting average	8.50
100s/50s	0/0
Top score	33
Balls bowled	16
Wickets	36
Bowling average	0
5 wickets in innings	2
10 wickets in match	1
Best bowling	7/?
Catches/stumpings	6/-
- Source: CricketArchive, June 2026

Henry Edward Moberly (11 December 1822 at Madras – 22 September 1907 at Winchester, Hampshire) was an English cleric and school housemaster. As an amateur cricketer, he played from 1842 to 1845.

== Life ==
The eldest son of Lt-Col. Henry Moberly of Madras, Moberly was educated at Winchester College and New College, Oxford. He played cricket for Oxford University, making 10 known appearances.

Moberly matriculated at New College in 1841, graduating B.A. in 1845, and was a Fellow there from 1841 to 1860. He was ordained as a Church of England priest and became Dean of Divinity at New College in 1851, bursar in 1853 and sub-warden in 1856. He taught at Winchester College 1859–80 and founded one of the oldest boarding houses at Winchester, still known formally as Moberly's. He then became a parish priest and was vicar of Heckfield, Hampshire, 1880–83 and rector of St Michael's, Winchester, from 1883.

F. D. How included Moberly in the 1904 book Six Great Schoolmasters.
