= Highfield House, Heckfield =

Highfield House
- Location in Hampshire
- 51.338571°N 0.96472°W
- Location: Heckfield, Hampshire, England
- OS grid reference: SU 72369 60652

Listed Building – Grade II*
- Designated: 8 July 1952
- Reference no.: 1258374

Highfield House, also known as Highfield Park, is an early 17th-century Queen Anne style country house in Heckfield, Hampshire, England. A Grade II* listed building, it is now a hotel and venue centre.

It is built in brick with Bath stone dressings with a hipped tile roof and three facades. The north front is in three storeys, the remainder in two. There is a large 19th-century porch with Doric columns.

In 1757 the house, then known as Heckfield House, and its surrounding estate was incorporated into the neighbouring estate of Stratfield Saye, then owned by the Pitt family. Highfield (or Heckfield) House was occupied around that time by General Sir William Augustus Pitt, who improved the building and its associated parkland. Ten years after his death in 1809 the house was renamed Highfield to avoid confusion with another Heckfield House nearby.

For some years the house was residence of the Hon. General Sir Galbraith Lowry Cole, an army officer during the Peninsular war, and a personal friend of the Duke of Wellington. War Cabinet member and former Prime Minister Neville Chamberlain died of cancer in November 1940 whilst living in the house.

In the 1980s Highfield Park (as it was then called) was an Educational Services Centre for the Digital Equipment Corporation, combining IT training with the country house experience.

The building is now an hotel, known as Highfield Park.
