= Richard Hopkins (civil servant) =

British civil servant (1880–1955)

Sir Richard Valentine Nind Hopkins, GCB, PC (13 February 1880 – 30 March 1955) was a British civil servant. Born in 1880 to businessman Alfred Nind Hopkins and Eliza Mary Castle, Hopkins was educated at King Edward's School, Birmingham and Emmanuel College, Cambridge. First serving with the Board of Inland Revenue, 'Hoppy' was appointed chairman in 1922. In 1927 Hopkins was transferred to the Treasury, where he became the Permanent Secretary to the Treasury in 1942 and served in that position until 1945. He is credited with the (re)introduction of economist John Maynard Keynes to the Treasury during the Second World War, whose influence proved to be essential in many economic policy decisions (Middleton 2004).

Government offices
Preceded by Sir John Anderson	Chairman, Board of Inland Revenue; 1922–1927	Succeeded by Sir Ernest Gowers
Preceded by Sir Horace Wilson	Head of the Home Civil Service & Permanent Secretary to the Treasury; 1939–1942	Succeeded by Sir Edward Bridges
