= Guilty Men =

Short polemical book published in 1940

Guilty Men is a British polemical book written under the pseudonym "Cato" that was published in July 1940, after the failure of British forces to prevent the defeat and occupation of Norway and France by Nazi Germany. It attacked fifteen public figures for their failed policies towards Germany and for their failure to re-equip the British armed forces. In denouncing appeasement, it defined the policy as the "deliberate surrender of small nations in the face of Hitler's blatant bullying". A denunciation of the former government's policy, it shaped popular and scholarly thinking for the next two decades.

== Contents ==
The book's slogan, "Let the guilty men retire", was an attack on members of the National Government before Winston Churchill became Prime Minister in May 1940. Most were Conservatives, although some were National Liberals and one was Ramsay MacDonald, the former leader of the Labour Party. Several were current members of Churchill's government. The book shaped popular thinking about appeasement for twenty years; it effectively destroyed the reputation of former Prime Ministers Stanley Baldwin and Neville Chamberlain, and contributed to the defeat of the Conservative Party at the 1945 general election. According to historian David Dutton, "its impact upon Chamberlain's reputation, both among the general public and within the academic world, was profound indeed".

According to the book, the "guilty men" were:

- Neville Chamberlain
- Sir John Simon
- Sir Samuel Hoare
- Ramsay MacDonald
- Stanley Baldwin
- Lord Halifax
- Sir Kingsley Wood
- Ernest Brown
- David Margesson
- Sir Horace Wilson
- Sir Thomas Inskip
- Leslie Burgin
- Earl Stanhope
- W. S. Morrison
- Sir Reginald Dorman-Smith

Though mostly devoted to what the authors see as the blindness and inertia of the Conservative majority that in 1939 led a drastically under-prepared Britain into war, followed by the disastrous losses of Norway and of France in 1940, the authors look briefly at the British Army's contribution to these failures. While praising the discipline and courage of the soldiers in the field, they point to grave errors of strategy. In their opinion, some lessons that should have been obvious from the 1914–1918 war over the same terrain in France were ignored: you need a secure perimeter to fall back on in need; you need a mobile reserve to call on; in defence, you must guard against infiltration by motorised infantry and you need copious anti-aircraft and anti-tank artillery; to attack, you need superiority in aircraft and tanks.

== Authorship ==
Guilty Men was written by three journalists: Michael Foot (a future leader of the Labour Party), Frank Owen (a former Liberal MP), and Peter Howard (a Conservative). They believed that Britain had suffered a succession of bad leaders who, with junior ministers, advisers and officials, had conducted a disastrous foreign policy towards Germany and had failed to prepare the country for war. After Victor Gollancz, creator of the Left Book Club, had been persuaded to publish the book, the authors divided the 24 chapters among themselves and wrote it in four days, finishing on 5 June 1940. Gollancz asked for some of the rhetoric to be toned down, fearing the reaction it might provoke, but he rushed it into print in four weeks.

It was under a pseudonym because the writers were employed by Lord Beaverbrook, who barred his journalists from writing for publications other than his own. Beaverbrook, who was active in the Conservative Party, was also a vocal supporter of appeasement, though he was not mentioned in the book.

There was much speculation as to who Cato was. At one time Aneurin Bevan was named as its author. Randolph Churchill (Winston's son, also a Beaverbrook journalist) was also wrongly attributed as its author. In the meantime, the real authors had some fun reviewing their own work. Michael Foot wrote an article, "Who Is This Cato?" Beaverbrook was as much in the dark as anyone but joked that he "made do with the royalties from Guilty Men". The authors earned no money from the book as their literary agent Ralph Pinker, son of the much more successful James B. Pinker, absconded with the royalties.

== Publication ==
Guilty Men was published in early July 1940, shortly after Winston Churchill became Prime Minister, the Dunkirk evacuation had shown Britain's military unpreparedness, and the Fall of France left the country with few allies. Several major book wholesalers, W. H. Smith and Wyman's, and the largest book distributor, Simpkin Marshall, refused to handle the book. It was sold on news-stands and street barrows, and went through twelve editions in July 1940, selling 200,000 copies in a few weeks.

Guilty Men remains in circulation, and was reprinted for its historical interest by Penguin Books to mark its sixtieth anniversary in 2000.

== Evaluation ==
The book's arguments and conclusions have been questioned by politicians and historians. In 1945, Quintin Hogg, MP, wrote The Left Was Never Right, which was critical of Guilty Men and argued that "unpreparedness before the war was largely the consequence of the policies of the parties of the Left". In 1944, Geoffrey Mander published We Were Not All Wrong.

The fact that all bar one of the 15 "guilty men" named were either Conservatives or Liberals caused controversy – no mention was made, for example, of the Labour Party (UK) cabinet member and mid-1930s leader George Lansbury, a pacifist who advocated Unilateral disarmament in the face of fascist rearmament.

The idea of appeasement as error and cowardice was challenged by historian A. J. P. Taylor in his book The Origins of the Second World War (1960), in which he argued that, in the circumstances, it might be seen as a rational policy.

== See also ==
- The Left Was Never Right, a Tory contrary view by Quintin Hogg

== Notes ==
=== Bibliography ===
- Cato (1940). Guilty men. London: V. Gollancz. OCLC 301463537., London: Faber and Faber, 2010, ISBN 978-0-571-27020-0
