= The Left Was Never Right =

1945 book by Quintin Hogg

- Author: Quintin Hogg
- Language: English
- Publisher: Faber and Faber
- Publication date: June 1945
- Publication place: United Kingdom

The Left Was Never Right was a book published in June 1945 by British Conservative politician Quintin Hogg which examined the speeches and policies of politicians from Britain's Labour Party and Liberal Party concerning British re-armament before World War II and the appeasement of Nazi Germany. These were contrasted to quotes by Conservative politicians such as Winston Churchill and Sir Austen Chamberlain supporting British re-armament and opposing the appeasement of Germany. The books dust-jacket quoted Jesus' remark that "Out of thine own mouth will I judge thee" from the Gospel of Luke.

Hogg stated that books published by Victor Gollancz were "morally wicked, unpatriotic and factually incorrect. The Left Was Never Right was an attempt to set the record straight and to establish that unpreparedness before the war was largely the consequence of the policies of the parties of the Left". It was the only book published which specifically countered books published by Gollancz such as Guilty Men. In his memoirs, Hogg wrote that although the book was "a success ... it was too little too late to counteract the impression made by the earlier Gollancz publications".
