= Peter Howard (journalist) =

England international rugby union player, journalist & playwright

- Born: Peter Dunsmore Howard; 20 December 1908; Maidenhead, Berkshire, England
- Died: 25 February 1965 (aged 56); Lima, Peru
- Education: University of Oxford

Peter Dunsmore Howard (20 December 1908 – 25 February 1965) was a British journalist, playwright, captain of the England national rugby union team and leader of Moral Re-Armament from 1961 to 1965. He also won a World Championship bobsleigh medal in 1939.

== Biography ==
Born in Maidenhead, England, Howard was educated at Mill Hill School. A graduate of the University of Oxford and journalist, Howard captained the England national rugby union team while he worked with Oswald Mosley for the New Party. Howard represented Oxford University RFC in The Varsity Match in 1929 and 1930 and made his England debut against Wales in January 1930 while he was still at Oxford. He played eight times for England and in all four matches in the Five Nations Championship in both 1930 and 1931. He captained England against Ireland at Twickenham in 1931, Ireland winning 6–5. In 1939, he won the silver medal in the four-man event at the FIBT World Championships in St. Moritz.

After a flirtation with Mosley's Blackshirts, when he was recruited to lead the party's "Biff Boys", Howard joined the Conservative Party and became a political correspondent and investigative reporter for Lord Beaverbrook's Daily Express. In 1940, with the Labour Party's future leader Michael Foot and the Liberal Party's Frank Owen, Howard wrote the political polemic, Guilty Men, against Britain's appeasement and the politicians responsible for it.

Meanwhile, Howard had been assigned by Lord Beaverbrook to investigate the 1930s English evangelical movement of the American religious leader Frank Buchman, the Oxford Group, which was later renamed Moral Re-Armament. Howard interviewed Buchman and eventually left the Daily Express and joined the inner circle of Moral Re-Armament. In 1941, he published the book Innocent Men in which he took a different view of the politicians lambasted in Guilty Men only a year earlier. He still sharply questioned the relationship between press and government in wartime Britain but also expressed his views about the role that Moral Re-Armament could play.

Moral Re-Armament made the fight against communism a high priority during and after World War II and considered it a threat to peace and religious freedom. Howard wrote 17 plays, which were mostly perceived as both extremely didactic and anticommunist on the themes of co-operation and dialogue in industrial relations, politics, and personal life.

After Buchman died in 1961, Howard was his chosen successor as leader of the worldwide Moral Re-Armament movement. Howard travelled extensively until he died of viral pneumonia in Lima, Peru, in February 1965.

Howard married 1932 Wimbledon ladies doubles champion Doris Metaxa, and they had three children: Anne Marie, Anthony John and The Times journalist Philip Howard. Doë (Doris) Metaxa Howard was born in Greece on 12 June 1911, but she was raised in Marseille and represented France at Wimbledon; she died on 7 September 2007, aged 96.

== Works ==
- Innocent Men (1941)
- Fighters Ever (1942)
- Ideas Have Legs (1945)
- That Man Frank Buchman (1946)
- Men on Trial (1946)
- The World Rebuilt (1951)
- The Real News (1953)
- The Dictators' Slippers (1953)
- The Boss (1953)
- Remaking Men (1954)
- We Are Tomorrow (1954)
- Effective Statesmanship (1955)
- The Vanishing Island (1955)
- Rumpelsnits (1956)
- America Needs An Ideology (1957)
- The Man Who Would Not Die (1957)
- Miracle in the Sun (1959)
- Pickle Hill (1959)
- The Hurricane (1960)
- The Ladder (1960)
- Frank Buchman's Secret (1961)
- Music at Midnight (1962)
- Space Is So Startling (1962)
- Britain and the Beast (1963)
- Through The Garden Wall (1963)
- The Diplomats (1963)
- Design For Dedication (1964)
- Beaverbrook: A Study of Max The Unknown (1964)
- Mr Brown Comes Down The Hill (1964)
- Give A Dog A Bone (1964)
- Happy Death-Day (1965)
- Above The Smoke And Stir (1975)
