= Heckfield =

Village and civil parish in Hampshire, UK

Coordinates: 51.342316°N 0.974069°W

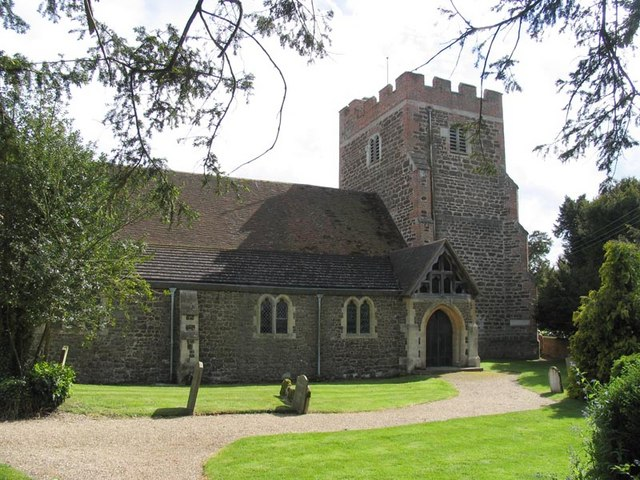
- St Michael's Church, Heckfield

- Location within Hampshire
- Population: 339 (2011 Census including Hound Green)
- OS grid reference: SU7155660858
- District: Hart
- Shire county: Hampshire
- Region: South East
- Country: England
- Sovereign state: United Kingdom
- Post town: Hook
- Postcode district: RG27
- Dialling code: 0118; 01276
- Police: Hampshire and Isle of Wight
- Fire: Hampshire and Isle of Wight
- Ambulance: South Central
- UK Parliament: North East Hampshire

Heckfield is a village in Hampshire, England. It lies between Reading and Hook.

It is the location of Highfield House, where Neville Chamberlain died in 1940, and it is adjacent to Stratfield Saye House, the large stately home that has been the home of the Dukes of Wellington since 1817. Highfield House is now a hotel and venue facility.

There has been a church on the site of St Michael's since least the 12th-century.
