= European foreign policy of the Chamberlain ministry =

Foreign relations

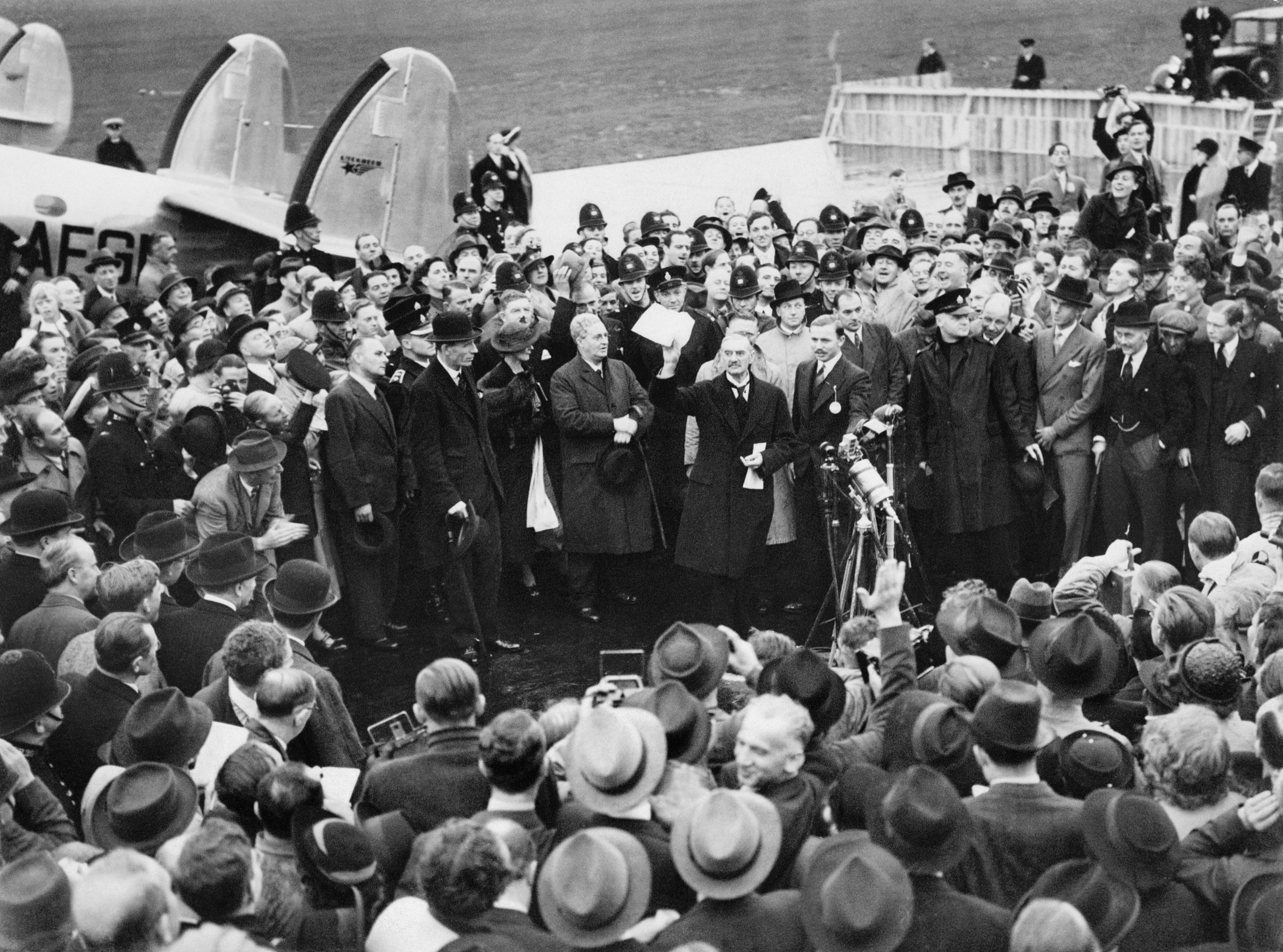
Neville Chamberlain shows the Anglo-German Declaration, the resolution to commit to peaceful methods signed by both Hitler and himself on his return from Munich at Heston Aerodrome on 30 September 1938. He said: the settlement of the Czechoslovakian problem, which has now been achieved is, in my view, only the prelude to a larger settlement in which all Europe may find peace. This morning I had another talk with the German Chancellor, Herr Hitler, and here is the paper which bears his name upon it as well as mine (waves paper to the crowd – receiving loud cheers and "Hear Hears"). Some of you, perhaps, have already heard what it contains but I would just like to read it to you Later that day he stood outside Number 10 Downing Street and again read from the document and concluded: My good friends, for the second time in our history, a British Prime Minister has returned from Germany bringing peace with honour. I believe it is peace for our time.

The European foreign policy of the Chamberlain ministry from 1937 to 1940 was based on British Prime Minister Neville Chamberlain's commitment to "peace for our time" by pursuing a policy of appeasement and containment towards Nazi Germany and by increasing the strength of Britain's armed forces until, in September 1939, he delivered an ultimatum over the invasion of Poland, which was followed by a declaration of war against Germany.

== Commitment to peace ==
Like many others in Europe who had witnessed the horrors of the First World War and its aftermath, Chamberlain was committed to peace. The theory was that dictatorships arose if peoples had grievances and that by removing the source of those grievances, a dictatorship would become less aggressive. A popular belief was that the Treaty of Versailles was the underlying cause of Adolf Hitler's grievances. Chamberlain, as even his political detractors admitted, was an honourable man, who had been raised in the old school of European politics. His attempts to deal with Nazi Germany through diplomatic channels and to quell any sign of dissent from within, particularly from Churchill, were called by Chamberlain "the general policy of appeasement" on 30 June 1934.

== Rearmament ==
A major structural problem that Chamberlain confronted at the beginning of his premiership and a major factor in development of his foreign policy was the problem of worldwide defence commitments and an insufficient economic and financial basis to sustain those commitments. According to a report by the British Chiefs of Staff in 1937, which had much influence on Chamberlain:

Even today we could face without apprehension an emergency either in the Far East or the Mediterranean, provided that we were free ... to concentrate sufficient strength in one or other of these areas ... But the outstanding feature of the present situation is the increasing probability that a war started in any one of these three areas [the third being Western Europe] may extend to one or both of the other two ... we cannot foresee the time when our defense forces will be strong enough to safeguard our territory, trade, and vital interests against Germany, Italy and Japan simultaneously. We cannot, therefore, exaggerate the importance, from the point of view of Imperial defense, of any political or international action that can be taken to reduce the numbers of our potential enemies or to gain the support of potential allies.

Chamberlain expressed his concerns about the possibility of a three-front war with insufficient resources in October 1937 when he told the Cabinet, "If this country were to become involved [in a war with Japan] in the Far East the temptation to the dictator states to take action whether in Eastern Europe or in Spain would be irresistible".

Moreover, the economic capability to provide for a sufficient military force to meet all worldwide defence commitments did not exist, which meant a greater reliance on diplomacy would be needed to reduce to the number of potential enemies. Chamberlain had two options (which were not mutually exclusive): to reduce potential enemies by appeasing their grievances (as long as the grievances were understood to be limited in nature and justified) and to raise Britain's strength by forming alliances with other states. In 1937 and 1938, a greater emphasis was placed upon the former option, and in 1939 and 1940, the latter was prioritised. An important part of his strategy was rearmament, which was intended to ensure that Britain could negotiate from a position of strength, deter a potential enemy from choosing war as an option, and, in the worst-case scenario of war breaking out, ensure that Britain was prepared.

Chamberlain put great emphasis upon the Royal Air Force. In October 1936, as Chancellor of the Exchequer, Chamberlain had told the Cabinet, "Air power was the most formidable deterrent to war that could be devised". As both Chancellor of the Exchequer and Prime Minister, Chamberlain greatly expanded the RAF's budget, which rose from £16.78 million in 1933 to £105.702 million in 1939. This surpassed both the British Army's budget in 1937 and the Royal Navy's in 1938. By the 1930s, a long economic decline, accelerated by the Great Slump, had led to the British economy contracting to such a point that there were not enough factories, machine tools, skilled workers and money to simultaneously build up a larger RAF, a Royal Navy of such size to fight two wars in two oceans at once and a British Army capable of fighting a major European power, which led to Chamberlain favouring the RAF at the expense of both the Royal Navy and, even more so, the British Army.

In 1937, Chamberlain introduced the strategy of "limited liability" in which Britain would avoid the supposed mistakes of the First World War by limiting its efforts to war in the sea and the air, rather than a large commitment of ground forces in France. Under this strategy, the British Army suffered massive cuts while the Royal Navy and especially the RAF experienced a massive expansion.

Rearmament entailed major problems for the British economy. The huge increase in military spending in the late 1930s threatened the balance of payments, the reserves of US dollars and gold, inflation, and ultimately lowered the government's credit. Because of a lack of indigenous sources, much of the steel, instruments, aircraft and machine tools that were needed for rearmament had to be purchased abroad, but increased military production reduced the number of factories devoted to exports, which would lead to a serious balance of payments problem. Moreover, the increased taxes to pay for rearmament hampered economic growth, and heavy borrowing to pay for rearmament damaged perceptions of British credit, leading to strong pressure being put on the pound sterling. By 1939, Chamberlain's government was devoting well over half of its revenues to defence.

Chamberlain's policy of rearmament faced much domestic opposition from the Labour Party, which initially favoured a policy of disarmament and, until late 1938, always voted against increases in the defence budget. Even then, Labour merely switched towards a policy of abstention on defence votes. Labour repeatedly condemned Chamberlain for engaging in an arms race with Germany and some members urged for Britain simply to disarm instead in the expectation that this example would inspire all other powers to do likewise. Throughout the early 1930s, Labour frequently disparaged Chamberlain as a crazed warmonger who preferred high levels of military spending to high levels of social spending.

== Diplomatic efforts ==
A major problem for Chamberlain was that Britain lacked the industrial infrastructure and the financial strength to win an arms race with Germany, Italy and Japan at once. Chamberlain hoped to detach either Italy from Germany or Germany from Italy. He was indifferent as to which one of them, but Japan was considered to be hopelessly intransigent. Then, Britain could win the arms race with the remaining members of the Axis. In a letter that was written in June 1937, Chamberlain summed up his views: "If only we could get on terms with the Germans I wouldn't care a rap for Musso [Benito Mussolini]". Chamberlain would later write in his diary in January 1938, "From the first I have been trying to improve relations with the two storm centres Berlin & Rome. It seemed to me that we were drifting into worse & worse positions with both with the prospect of having ultimately to face 2 enemies at once".

=== Potential allies ===
Chamberlain's initial emphasis on trying to win over potential enemies was partly because of a pessimistic assessment of potential allies. Britain's top military experts consistently advised that the Soviet Union's Red Army was of dubious fighting value. The Neutrality Acts, passed by the US Congress in the mid-1930s, convinced him that no help could be expected from the United States in the event of a war. In October 1937, as part of an effort to engage the United States into international affairs, Chamberlain instructed the British delegation, which was being sent to Washington, D.C., to negotiate a free trade agreement between both countries, that for "political" reasons, reaching an agreement with the Americans at all costs was critical. Even before the talks began, he had ordered the British delegation to accept the preconditions that the Americans deemed "essentials". France was downgraded as a potential ally because of the highly-negative assessment in the dispatches of British Ambassador Eric Phipps.

=== Germany ===
One of Chamberlain's early foreign policy goals was to seek a "general settlement" to win German acceptance and guarantee a peaceful Europe by settling all of the grievances that he considered to be justified. In May 1937, during the talks with Reichsbank President Hjalmar Schacht, who was visiting London, the British drew up a paper that listed their demands: the Germans to return to the League of Nations, a nonaggression pact for Western Europe, a treaty limiting armaments and "measures by Germany, in treaty form or otherwise, which will satisfy the governments of Central and Eastern Europe with regard ... to respect the territorial integrity and sovereign independence of all Central and Eastern European states". Most importantly, the general settlement was to be negotiated from a position of strength and so for Chamberlain, it was preferable to complete British rearmament before they undertook such talks. The emphasis was put on Germany because the report of the Defense Requirements Committee (DRC) on 28 February 1934, which Chamberlain had helped to write as Chancellor of the Exchequer, called Germany "the ultimate potential enemy against whom our `long-range' defense policy must be directed".

The emphasis upon Germany was because of an assessment of Germany's power. It had nothing to do with friendly feelings towards Germany on Chamberlain's part, and his feelings towards Germans were summarised well in a letter that he wrote to one of his sisters in 1930 in which he stated, "On the whole I hate Germans".

=== Italy ===
As part of his policy to reduce the number of Britain's potential enemies, Chamberlain greatly stressed the use of the Gentlemen's Agreement in January 1937 as the basis of winning Italy back to the Western fold. Chamberlain believed that Italy and Germany were tied together by the Spanish Civil War and that if Italian Prime Minister Benito Mussolini could be persuaded to withdraw his troops from Spain, Italy would orbit back to the anti-German Stresa Front. In the summer of 1937, Chamberlain started to use Sir Joseph Ball of the Conservative Party Research Department and the Maltese lawyer Adrian Dingli to contact Italian Foreign Minister Galeazzo Ciano to circumvent the Foreign Office and Foreign Secretary Anthony Eden since they were less enthusiastic on the prospects of winning back Italy. The prospect of talks was interrupted in August 1937 by Italian submarine attacks on neutral ships carrying supplies for the Spanish Republic.

After strong pressure from Eden, the Nyon Conference was called in September 1937, and the British and French navies agreed to patrol the Mediterranean to suppress "piracy", a euphemism for Italian attacks. The patrols even included the Italian Navy, which was permitted to save face by patrolling the Tyrrhenian Sea against its own "pirate" submarine attacks on ships that were bound for the Spanish Republicans.

=== United States ===
The first foreign policy crisis of Chamberlain's government occurred in December 1937, when the Japanese attacked and damaged a British gunboat, HMS Ladybird, on the Yangtze River in China, and injured Sir Hughe Knatchbull-Hugessen, the British ambassador to China, by strafing his car. Japanese planes had also sunk an American gunboat, the USS Panay, on the Yangtze. Chamberlain hoped to use the Panay incident to bring the United States out of its neutrality and instructed Foreign Secretary Anthony Eden to inform the Americans that Britain was prepared to send eight or nine capital ships to the naval base at Singapore, if the Americans did likewise, to threaten Japan with a blockade if it refused to make amends for the attacks. The American refusal of Chamberlain's offer and the decision to accept Japan's apology instead for sinking the Panay did much to disillusion him of the prospects of American support if a major war occurred. In a letter to Hilda Chamberlain, one of his sisters, he expressed his view:

I am trying to jolly them [the Americans] along with a view to making some sort of joint (or at least "parallel") naval action. They are incredibly slow and have missed innumerable busses. ... I do wish the Japs would beat up an American or two! But of course, the little d—v--ls are too cunning for that, & we may eventually have to act alone & hope the Yanks will follow before it's too late.

The most that US President Franklin Roosevelt was prepared to agree to was the opening of secret naval talks in London in January 1938 as a contingency measure if another "incident" occurred in the Far East.

== 1938: Early negotiations ==
The very noisy agitation of the Reichskolonialbund (Reich Colonial League) for the return of the former German colonies in Africa had made Chamberlain conclude by 1937 that the colonial issue was Germany's most important grievance. In January 1938, Chamberlain informed the Foreign Policy Committee that he intended to place the colonial issue "in the forefront" but noted that "the examination of the colonial question could only be undertaken as a part and parcel of a general settlement". Chamberlain proposed an international regime of all leading European powers to administer a vast area of central Africa. In return for participating in the proposed African administration, Hitler was to promise never to use violence to change the frontiers of Germany. The plan foundered on 3 March 1938, when Nevile Henderson, the British Ambassador in Berlin, presented Chamberlain's proposal to Hitler, who rejected the idea on the grounds that Germany should not have to negotiate for any bit of Africa, and he announced that he was prepared to wait ten years or longer for a unilateral return of the former colonies. Hitler's rejection of Chamberlain's African scheme, which had been intended as the first step towards achieving a "general settlement" of Germany's grievances, largely threw Chamberlain's scheme for orderly talks off the rails.

In March 1938, British-Italian talks on the withdrawal of the Italian forces from Spain were resumed. On 16 April 1938, the Easter Agreement was signed in Rome, which appeared to settle all the outstanding disputes between both countries. However, the prospect of the Easter Agreement coming into force was hampered when Mussolini, despite his promises, sent more troops to Spain.

As part of its policy to try to win Italy away from Germany by reducing that country's involvement in Spain, Chamberlain's cabinet slowly dismantled the powers of the Non-Intervention Committee for the Spanish Civil War in 1937, and it was silent in relation to the gradual ostracism of to the leftist Juan Negrín government from that organisation.

== 1938: Anschluss and Austria ==
The first European crisis of Chamberlain's premiership was over the German annexation of Austria. Austrian Nazis had already assassinated Austrian Chancellor Engelbert Dollfuss in 1934, and they were now pressuring Chancellor Kurt Schuschnigg.

Informed of Germany's objectives, Chamberlain's government decided it was unable to stop events and so acquiesced to what later became known as the Anschluss in March 1938 in which Austria became part of Germany.

== 1938: Sudetenland crisis and Czechoslovakia ==
The second crisis came over the Sudetenland area of western Czechoslovakia, which was home to a large ethnic German majority. Under the guise of seeking self-determination for ethnic Germans, Hitler planned to launch a war of aggression, codenamed Fall Grün (Case Green), on 1 October 1938. Though Chamberlain would have preferred to avoid a war over the Sudeten issue, and Britain had no defence obligations to Czechoslovakia, the 1924 French-Czechoslovak alliance meant that a German attack on Czechoslovakia would automatically become a French-German war. Since it was an unacceptable change in the balance of power to have France defeated by Germany, Britain would have no choice except to intervene to avoid a French defeat. In addition, the vague British statement on 19 March 1936 issued after the remilitarisation of the Rhineland linked British and French security and created a strong moral case for France to demand British intervention if a French-German war began.

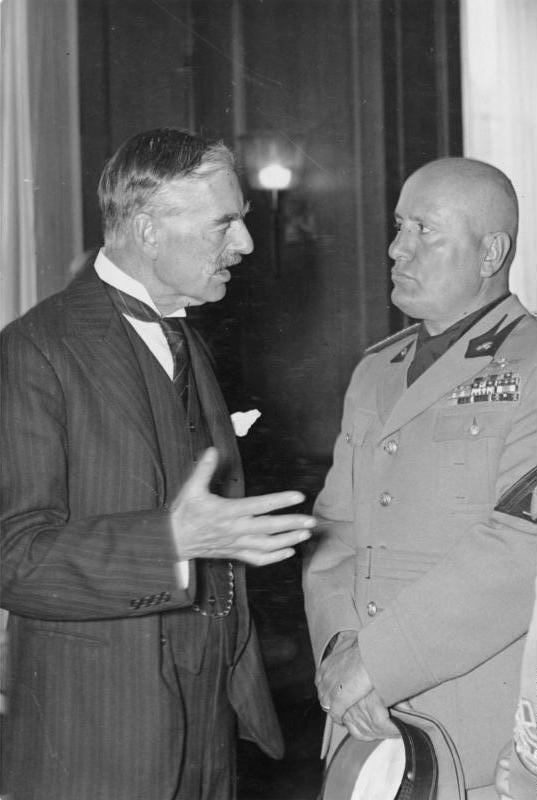
Chamberlain with Mussolini at the Munich Conference

In an effort to defuse the looming crisis, Chamberlain followed a dual strategy of pressuring Prague to make concessions to the ethnic Germans and of warning Berlin on the dangers of war. The problems of the tight wire act were well summarised by Chancellor the Exchequer John Simon in a diary entry during the May Crisis of 1938: "We are endeavoring at one & the same time, to restrain Germany by warning her that she must not assume we could remain neutral if she crossed the frontier; to stimulate Prague to make concessions; and to make sure that France will not take some rash action such as mobilization (when has mobilization been anything but a prelude to war?), under the delusion that we would join her in defense of Czechoslovakia. We won't and can't-but an open declaration to this effect would only give encouragement to Germany's intransigence." (emphasis in the original) In a letter to a sister, Chamberlain wrote that he would contact Hitler and tell him, "The best thing you [Hitler] can do is tell us exactly what you want for your Sudeten Germans. If it is reasonable we will urge the Czechs to accept and if they do, you must give assurances that you will let them alone in the future".

=== Preparations for war ===
As part of the preparations for a possible war over the Sudetenland conflict, Chamberlain ordered RAF Bomber Command to start drawing up a list of possible targets in Germany. A two-division force was to start preparing for a possible deployment to France.

Chamberlain's conduct of the Czechoslovak crisis in 1938 was influenced also by highly exaggerated fears, both promoted and endorsed by military experts, of the effects of German bombing on British cities. In early 1938, the Committee of Imperial Defence (CID) informed Chamberlain that it could be reasonably expected that a German strategic bombing offensive against Britain would result in half-a-million civilian deaths within the first three weeks. For the first week alone, the CID's estimated death rate from bombing was 150,000 dead (in fact, that number was close to the entire British deaths by bombing during all of World War II). In 1938, General Edmund Ironside wrote in his diary of a government whose chief fear was "of a war being finished in a few weeks by the annihilation of Great Britain. They can see no other kind of danger than air attack". Ironside himself shared those fears as he noted in his diary in September 1938: "We have not the means of defending ourselves and he [Chamberlain] knows it. ... We cannot expose ourselves to a German attack. We simply commit suicide if we do." (emphasis in the original) Meanwhile, General Sir Hastings Ismay, of the CID, informed the government in September 1938 that extra time to rearm would leave Britain better prepared to fight a possible war with Germany: "From the military point of view, time is in our favour ... if war with Germany has to come, it would be better to fight her in say 6–12 months' time than to accept the present challenge".

=== Dominions oppose war in Europe ===
Another factor that influenced Chamberlain's policy during the Czechoslovak crisis was the attitude of the dominions. Ever since the Chanak Crisis in 1922, it had been understood in London that Britain could not count on the automatic support of the dominions, which would quite possibly declare their neutrality, rather than fight for Britain. With the partial exception of New Zealand, all dominions, particularly Canada and South Africa, entirely favoured concessions to avert a war in Central Europe that they felt did not concern them. They were also quietly critical of Chamberlain for running what they regarded as unacceptable risks of war. The dominions' attitudes had great influence with Chamberlain, as he believed that Britain could not fight, let alone win, a war without the support of the entire empire. The editor of The Times, Geoffrey Dawson, later recalled: "No one who sat in this place, as I did during the autumn of '38, with almost daily visitations from eminent Canadians and Australians, could fail to realize that war with Germany at that time would have been misunderstood and resented from end to end of the Empire. Even in this country there would have been no unity behind it".

=== German opposition plans for putsch ===
During the summer of 1938, the British government received several messages from members of the anti-Nazi opposition in Germany, such as Ewald von Kleist-Schmenzin, seeking to use the Czechoslovak crisis as the pretext for a putsch. Chamberlain was generally indifferent to the proposals and refused British support. The American historian Gerhard Weinberg argued that the three visits to London in the summer of 1938 by three different messengers from the opposition, each bearing the message (a firm British stand made in favour of Czechoslovakia would cause a putsch that would remove the Nazi regime), with each ignorant of the other messengers' existence, presented a picture of a group that was apparently not very well organised. Thus, it is unreasonable for historians to expect Chamberlain to have staked the crucial question of war and peace on the uncorroborated words of such a group.

=== Plan Z ===
In August 1938, information reached London that Germany was beginning to mobilise reservists. Information leaked from antiwar elements within the German military that war against Czechoslovakia was scheduled for sometime in September.

Finally, as a result of intense French and especially British diplomatic pressure, Czechoslovak President Edvard Beneš unveiled on 5 September 1938 the Fourth Plan for constitutional reorganisation of his country, which granted most of the demands for Sudeten autonomy that had been made by Konrad Henlein in his Karlsbad speech in April 1938 and so threatened to deprive the Germans of their pretext for aggression. Henlein's supporters promptly responded to the offer of the Fourth Plan by having a series of violent clashes with the Czechoslovak police, culminating in the declaration of martial law in certain Sudeten districts after major clashes in mid-September. In response to the threatening situation, in late August, Chamberlain had conceived of Plan Z, to fly to Germany, meet Hitler and work out an agreement that could end the crisis.

The prospect of Chamberlain flying on a dramatic peace mission to Germany was seen as a gesture that was highly bold and daring. Plan Z was a great public relations success, but it deprived the British delegation of expert advice and advance preparation.

The instigator of Plan Z was Chamberlain's political advisor and spin doctor, Sir Joseph Ball; as Director of the Conservative Research Department, he and Horace Wilson were chief proponents of appeasement. As early as 1935, Ball had advised Chamberlain on Plan X in relation to government policy. Chamberlain advised his inner circle, consisting of Halifax, Wilson, Simon, and Alexander Cadogan, of his intention to fly to Germany on 8 September 1938.

What finally led to Chamberlain making his offer to fly to Germany on 13 September 1938 was erroneous information, which had been supplied by the German opposition, of the invasion of Czechoslovakia starting anytime after 18 September.

Hitler was not happy with Chamberlain's offer but agreed to see him, most probably because to refuse Chamberlain's offer would give the lie to his repeated claims that he was a man of peace who had been reluctantly driven to war by Beneš's intractability.

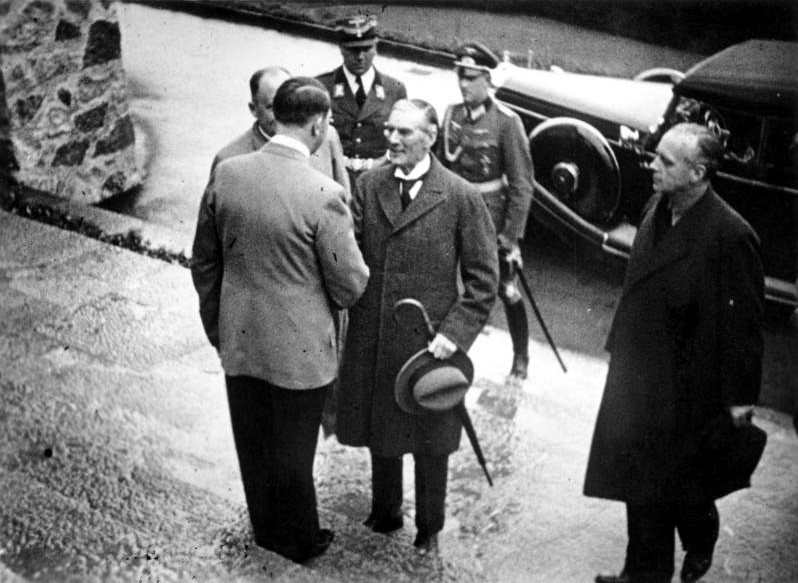
Hitler greets Chamberlain on the steps of the Berghof on 15 September 1938.

In a summit at the Berghof, at Berchtesgaden, Chamberlain promised to pressure Prague into agreeing to Hitler's publicly-stated demands on allowing the Sudetenland to join Germany, in return for a reluctant promise by Hitler to postpone any military action until Chamberlain had been given the chance to fulfill his promise.

Under very heavy French-British pressure, Beneš agreed to cede the Sudetenland to Germany. Hitler had agreed to the postponement but expected that Prague would refuse Chamberlain's request to transfer the Sudetenland and was, by all accounts, most disappointed when French-British pressure secured just that. Most damaging to Czechoslovakia was that Chamberlain had implicitly agreed to Hitler's demand that all districts with at least 50% ethnic Germans should be transferred, as opposed to the 80% ethnic German limit that the British had been willing to consider, which considerably enlarged the area that would be transferred to Germany. The talks between Chamberlain and Hitler in September 1938 were made difficult by their innate differing concepts of what Europe should look like, with Hitler aiming to use the Sudeten issue as a pretext for war and Chamberlain genuinely striving for a peaceful solution.

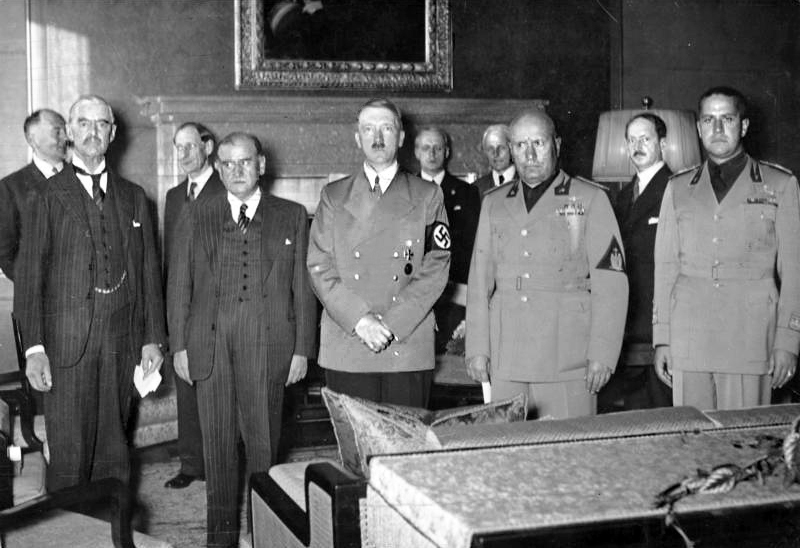
The Munich Conference: Chamberlain, Daladier, Hitler, Mussolini

=== Bad Godesberg negotiations ===
Upon his return to London after his Berchtesgaden summit, Chamberlain told the Cabinet that Hitler's aims were "strictly limited" to the Sudetenland and that he felt it was quite possible to avoid war if all played their part. When Chamberlain returned to present his plan for the transfer of the Sudetenland at a summit with Hitler at Bad Godesberg on 22 September 1938, the British delegation was most unpleasantly surprised to have Hitler reject the very plan he himself had presented to them at Berchtesgaden.

To put an end to Chamberlain's peacemaking efforts once and for all, Hitler demanded the Sudetenland to be ceded to Germany no later than 28 September 1938 with no negotiations between Prague and Berlin and no international commission to oversee the transfer, no plebiscites to be held in the transferred districts until after the transfer and, for good measure, Germany not forsaking war as an option until all the claims against Czechoslovakia by Poland and Hungary had been satisfied. The difference of views between the leaders was best symbolised when Chamberlain was presented with Hitler's new demands, which became known as the Godesberg Memorandum, and protested at being presented with an ultimatum, which led Hitler to claim that since the document that stated his new demands was entitled "Memorandum", it could not be an ultimatum.

Though Chamberlain was inclined to give the most hopeful impressions on the post Bad Godesberg situation, most of the Cabinet, led by the Foreign Secretary Lord Halifax, who was influenced by the Permanent Under-Secretary of the Foreign Office, Alexander Cadogan, considered the Bad Godesberg ultimatum to be unacceptable. Germany's increased demands were formally rejected on 25 September 1938. To underline that point further, Sir Horace Wilson, the British government's Chief Industrial Advisor, and a close associate of Chamberlain was dispatched to Berlin to inform Hitler that if the Germans attacked Czechoslovakia, France would honour her commitments under the 1924 French-Czechoslovak treaty, and "then England would feel honour bound, to offer France assistance". Thus, as Chamberlain himself noted after 25 September 1938, the world was about to be plunged into war over the question of the timing of the changeover of border posts. Hitler insisted in his Bad Godesberg ultimatum for the Sudetenland to be ceded to Germany no later than 1 October 1938 although the Anglo-French plan, which Chamberlain had presented and Hitler had rejected, called for ceding of the Sudetenland within six months. In reference to the timing of the turnover of the Sudetenland and to trenches being dug in a London central park, Chamberlain infamously declared in a radio broadcast on 27 September 1938:

How horrible, fantastic, incredible it is that we should be digging trenches and trying on gas-masks here because of a quarrel in a far away country between people of whom we know nothing. ... I am myself a man of peace to the depths of my soul.

=== Munich Agreement ===
While he was initially determined to continue with Fall Grün, the attack against Czechoslovakia planned for 1 October 1938, but sometime between 27 and 28 September, Hitler changed his mind and asked to take up a suggestion of Mussolini for a conference to be held in Munich on 30 September, to be attended by Hitler, Chamberlain, Mussolini, and French Prime Minister Édouard Daladier to discuss the Czechoslovak question. Since London had already agreed to the idea of a transfer of the disputed territory, the Munich Conference was mostly one day of discussions on technical questions about how the transfer of the Sudetenland would take place, and it featured the relatively-minor concessions from Hitler that the transfer would take place over a ten-day period in October and would be overseen by an international commission and that Germany could wait until Hungarian and Polish claims were settled. At the end of the conference, Chamberlain had Hitler sign a declaration of Anglo-German friendship to which Chamberlain attached great importance and Hitler none at all.

The Munich Agreement, engineered by the French and British governments, effectively allowed Hitler to annexe the country's defensive frontier, leaving its industrial and economic core within a day's reach of the Wehrmacht. Chamberlain flew to Munich to negotiate the agreement and received an ecstatic reception upon his return to Britain on 30 September 1938. At Heston Aerodrome, west of London, he made the now-famous "peace for our time" speech and waved the Anglo-German Declaration to a delighted crowd. When Hitler was invited to send troops to protect the Czechs from a Hungarian invasion, Chamberlain was criticized and decided to take a much harder line against the Germans, and later declared war against Germany after its invasion of Poland.

== 1938: Appeasement and alternatives ==
The repeated failures of Britain's government to deal with rising Nazi power have historically often been laid on the doorstep of Chamberlain, since he presided over the final collapse of peace. However, dealing with Germany under Chamberlain was difficult. Germany had begun general conscription and had already amassed an air army. Chamberlain, caught between the bleak finances of the Depression era; his own abhorrence of war; and Hitler, who would not be denied a war, gave ground and entered history as a political scapegoat for what was the more general failure of political will and vision that had begun with the Treaty of Versailles in 1919.

The policy of keeping the peace had broad support. If the House of Commons had wanted a more aggressive prime minister, Churchill would have been the obvious choice. Even after the outbreak of war, it was not clear that the invasion of Poland need lead to a general conflict. What convicted Chamberlain in the eyes of many commentators and historians was not the policy itself but his manner of carrying it out and the failure to hedge his bets. Many of his contemporaries viewed him as stubborn and unwilling to accept criticism, an opinion that was backed up by his brushing aside the views of cabinet ministers who disagreed with him on foreign policy. If accurate, that assessment of his personality would explain why Chamberlain strove to remain on friendly terms with Germany long after many of his colleagues became convinced that Hitler could not be restrained.

Chamberlain believed passionately in peace for many reasons, most of which are discussed in the article appeasement, and thought it his duty as Britain's leader to maintain stability in Europe. Like many people in Britain and elsewhere, he thought that the best way to deal with Germany's belligerence was to treat it with kindness and to meet its demands. He also believed that the leaders of people are essentially rational beings and so Hitler must be rational as well. Most historians believe that Chamberlain, in holding to these views, pursued the policy of appeasement far longer than was justifiable, but it is not exactly clear whether any course could have averted war and whether the outcome would have been any better had armed hostilities begun earlier. France was also unwilling to commit its forces, and there were no other effective allies. Italy had joined the Pact of Steel, the Soviet Union had signed a non-aggression pact and the United States was still officially neutral. Chamberlain's foreign policies have been the subject of intense debate for more than 70 years among academics, politicians, and diplomats. Historians' assessments have ranged from condemnation for allowing Germany to grow too strong to the judgment that Germany was so strong that it might well win a war and that postponing that showdown was in the best interests of Britain.

The historian Andrew Roberts argued in 2019, "Indeed, it is the generally accepted view in Britain today that they were right at least to have tried".

== Autumn 1938: Attitudes towards Italy, Germany and Japan ==
On 2 November 1938, Chamberlain made another effort to win Italy away from Germany by announcing that his government would soon bring the Easter Agreement into effect after the news that Italy was pulling 10,000 troops out of Spain. On 16 November, the Easter Agreement was declared to be in effect, and Britain recognised King Victor Emmanuel III of Italy as Emperor of Ethiopia. Shortly afterward, on 30 November 1938, the Italians laid claim to parts of France, causing an acute French-Italian crisis, which nearly scuttled Chamberlain's planned trip to Rome

During the winter of 1938–1939, Chamberlain's attitude to Germany noticeably hardened, partly because of the violent anti-British propaganda campaign that Hitler had launched in November 1938 and partly because of information supplied by anti-Nazis such as Carl Friedrich Goerdeler that German armament priorities were being shifted towards preparing for a war with Britain. In particular, Chamberlain was concerned with information that Hitler regarded the Munich Agreement as a personal defeat, together with hints from Berlin in December 1938 that Germans planned to renounce the Anglo-German Naval Agreement, which was regarded in London as the "barometer" of Anglo-German relations, in the near future. Also, reports relayed by the German opposition of Hitler's secret speech of 10 November 1938 to a group of German journalists; he complained that his peace propaganda of the previous five years had been too successful with the German people, and a new phrase of propaganda intended to promote hatred of other countries, particularly Britain. In response to the worsening relations with Berlin, Chamberlain decided that it was now too dangerous for Britain to accept the Balkans as an exclusive German economic zone, and he ordered a British "economic offensive" in the winter of 1938–1939 to subsidise the purchase of Balkan products that would otherwise be bought by the Germans. One comic aspect was that after considerable debate within Whitehall, Chamberlain ruled that for the sake of keeping Greece out of the German economic sphere of influence British smokers would have to endure Greek tobacco, which was regarded as inferior in Britain. Another major economic event in November 1938 was the signing of the Anglo-American trade agreement. Its signing was the start of increasing economic co-operation between Washington and London, which was intended to lead eventually to political co-operation.

In late 1938, Britain made a series of loans to China, which the British historian Victor Rothwell noted that his country "could ill afford" but were intended to keep China fighting against Japan. By then, it was accepted in Whitehall that it was better to keep China fighting, even at the risk of antagonising Japan since as long as it was embroiled in the war with China, Japan would be less likely to attack Britain's Asian colonies, which would free up British forces in Europe. The British Foreign Office was strongly pro-Chinese and, as Rothwell noted, Sir Robert Craigie, the British Ambassador in Tokyo was "slapped down when in late 1938 he advocated what, in effect, would have been a Far Eastern equivalent of Munich". The pro-Chinese sympathies of the Foreign Office were reflected in the greater respect given to the Sinophile ambassador to China, Archibald Clark Kerr, despite the straitlaced Japanophile Craigie being a far more traditional British diplomat than the flamboyant, hard-drinking and very active bisexual Clark Kerr. Britain could not risk a war with Japan, which would divert British military force to the Far East and thus encourage Germany and Italy to engage in aggressive actions. At the same time, the British government would not accept a Japanese conquest of China and so financially supported China. In late 1937, Chiang Kai-shek lost Shanghai, the business capital of China from which came 85% of Chinese tax revenues, to the Japanese. After the fall of Shanghai, Chiang was hard-pressed to find the money needed to continue the war with Japan. The Chamberlain government had its version of the domino theory in which if Japan conquered China, Japan would certainly extend its ambitions to Britain's Asian colonies and to the dominions of Australia and New Zealand. Chamberlain and the rest of his cabinet would never accept a Japanese conquest of Australia, New Zealand, India and the rest of the British colonies in the Far East, and they were resolved to fight to uphold Britain's position in the Asia-Pacific region, if necessary, and the Japanese made unacceptable demands. When Japan confiscated British-owned railways in China or seized British-owned ships in Chinese waters without compensation, the British government presented only notes of protest, as war with Japan was regarded only as a worst-case scenario. Meanwhile, money was still committed to the Singapore naval base and to fortifying Hong Kong to deter Japan from further aggression. The Chamberlain government would have liked to have enlisted the United States to present an Anglo-American front to stop the Japanese war against China, but the unwillingness of the Roosevelt administration to take such a step precluded a more active British policy in the Far East.

A trivial incident that reflected the deteriorating state of Anglo-German relations occurred in December 1938. Chamberlain addressed the correspondents of the German News Agency at a formal dinner in London and warned of the "futility of ambition, if ambition leads to the desire for domination". The implied rebuke to Hitler led to Herbert von Dirksen, the German ambassador to the Court of St. James, walking out of the dinner in protest. Moreover, reports from the Chiefs of Staff (COS) in late 1938 that within a year, British air defences would be strong enough because of the increased fighter production and the completion of the Home Link radar chain to resist and repel any German attempt at a "knock-out blow" from the air, the fear of which being a major factor in British policy in 1938. The assurances provided by the COS that Britain could repel and survive a German attempt at "knock out blow" in 1939 played a significant role in the change in emphasis in Chamberlain's foreign policy that year. In late 1938, Chancellor of the Exchequer John Simon reported to the Cabinet that the increased military spending that Chamberlain agreed to in 1937 and 1938 was leading to inflation, high interest rates, a balance of payments crisis and the danger that British financial reserves (the so-called "fourth arm of the defense") would be used up. In that situation, "we should have lost the means of carrying on a long struggle altogether". At the same time, Simon expressed concern to Chamberlain about the international repercussions if "defense plans should be openly seen to have been frustrated by the financial and economic situation".

== 1939: "Dutch War Scare" and German occupation of Czechoslovakia ==
In late January 1939, besides the concerns caused by the anti-British propaganda campaign unleashed by Hitler in November 1938 as well as by reports from intelligence sources of the huge increase in Kriegsmarine construction that was caused by Plan Z, the British government was thrown into a state of panic by the "Dutch War Scare". False reports, very likely planted by the Chief of the Abwehr, Admiral Wilhelm Canaris, suggested that the Germans were planning to invade the Netherlands in February 1939 to use Dutch airfields to launch a strategic bombing offensive to achieve a "knock-out blow" against Britain, by razing its cities to the ground. Since France was the only country capable of stopping a German offensive from overrunning the Netherlands, and French Foreign Minister Georges Bonnet, who may have been attempting to achieve a French-German understanding, had indicated that France would do nothing to stop such an offensive unless Britain made a major step for France, Chamberlain was forced to make the "continental commitment", to send a large expeditionary force to Europe.

Chamberlain's response to the war scare was to order full staff talks with France, to issue a public declaration that any German move into the Low Countries would be regarded as grounds for an immediate declaration of war and to order a major expansion to the size of the army, with the idea of peacetime conscription being seriously considered for the first time. On 6 February 1939, Chamberlain informed the House of Commons that any German attack on France would automatically be regarded as an attack on Britain. Besides that guarantee of France, between 26 January and 20 February 1939, Chamberlain issued guarantees of Switzerland, Belgium and the Netherlands since he believed that such diplomatic devices could block Hitler from waging aggression in Western Europe. In February 1939, Chamberlain announced that the size of the British Army would be massively increased, and the Territorial Army was increased from 13 to 26 divisions of reserves. In April 1939, peacetime conscription was ordered for the first time in British history, the first conscripts being called up in the summer. Chamberlain's reluctant embrace of the "continental commitment" in February 1939 meant the end of the "limited liability" doctrine, and it massively increased the economic problems of British rearmament.

The German coup of 15 March 1939, which saw the destruction of the rump Czechoslovakia, was one reason for the change of emphasis by Chamberlain, and it led to the "containment" strategy being adopted. On 17 March 1939, he gave a speech in Birmingham and stated Britain would oppose, by war if necessary, any German effort at domination. Speaking before the Cabinet on 18 March 1939, the minutes state:

The Prime Minister said that up till a week ago we had proceeded on the assumption that we should be able to continue with our policy of getting on to better terms with the Dictator Powers, and that although those powers had aims, those aims were limited. ... He had now come definitely to the conclusion that Herr Hitler's attitude made it impossible to continue on the old basis. ... No reliance could be placed on any of the assurances given by the Nazi leaders. ... he regarded his speech [in Birmingham of March 17] as a challenge to Germany on the issue whether or not Germany intended to dominate Europe by force. It followed that if Germany took another step in the direction of dominating Europe, she would be accepting the challenge.

== 1939: Polish guarantee ==
In mid-March 1939, Chamberlain's government was rocked by the so-called "Romanian War Scare", also known as the "Tilea Affair". The Romanian minister in London, Viorel Tilea, reported to the British government that his country was at imminent risk of German attack, which led to a U-turn on British policy of avoiding commitments in Eastern Europe. In fact, there was no German attack planned on Romania in March 1939, but major delays in the German programme to create synthetic oil from coal had vastly increased the importance of Romanian oil, and the German delegation from Hermann Göring's Four Year Plan, which was conducting talks in Bucharest, was applying strong pressure on Romania to turn over control of its oil industry to Germany. Historians debate whether Tilea deliberately exaggerated the German threat to Romania to gain British support against German demands for control of their oil industry, as the British historian D.C. Watt claimed, or if Tilea genuinely believed to be under the verge of a Hungarian-German invasion (troops from Romania's opponent Hungary were concentrating on the border) in March 1939, as the American historian Gerhard Weinberg claimed.

Chamberlain considered it to be desirable to keep Romania and its oil out of German hands since Germany had few natural supplies of oil. The Royal Navy's ability to impose a blockade was thus a British trump card either to deter or to win a war. The Polish guarantee on 31 March 1939 was intended to tie Poland to the West (Polish Foreign Minister Józef Beck was widely, if mistakenly, believed to be pro-German), and to ensure a quid pro quo, with Poland committing itself to protecting Romania and its oil from a German attack.

=== Historic views ===
A major historiographical debate about Chamberlain's foreign policy was triggered in 1976 by the American historian Simon K. Newman. In his book March 1939, Newman denied there was ever a policy of appeasement, as popularly understood. Newman maintained that British foreign policy under Chamberlain aimed at denying Germany a "free hand" anywhere in Europe, and any concessions that were offered were caused by military weaknesses, compounded by the economic problems of rearmament. Most controversially, Newman contended that the British guarantee to Poland in March 1939 was motivated by the desire to have Poland as a potential anti-German ally to block the chance for a German-Polish settlement of the Danzig (now Gdańsk, Poland) question by encouraging what Newman claimed to be Polish obstinacy over the Danzig issue to cause World War II. Newman argued that German-Polish talks on the question of returning Danzig had been going well until Chamberlain's guarantee and that it was his intention to sabotage the talks to cause an Anglo-German war.

Newman considered that the Polish guarantee had been meant by Chamberlain as a "deliberate challenge" to start a war with Germany in 1939. Newman argued that World War II, far from being a case of German aggression, was thus really only an Anglo-German struggle for power. Newman wrote that the war was not "Hitler's unique responsibility" but rather contended, "Instead of a German war of aggrandizement, the war become one of Anglo-German rivalry for power and influence, the culmination of the struggle for the right to determine the future configuration of Europe".

The "Newman controversy" caused much historical debate about what were Chamberlain's reasons for the "guarantee" of Poland in March 1939, with some reviewers arguing that Newman had failed to support his case with sufficient evidence.

On the other hand, the Polish historian Anna Cienciala described Newman's views as wrong and argued the British and the French wanted to avoid war by pressuring the Poles to make concessions.

Recently, Newman's book was cited by the American columnist Patrick Buchanan in his 2008 book Churchill, Hitler, and "The Unnecessary War" to lend support to his assertion that the British guarantee of Poland in March 1939 was an act of folly and caused an "unnecessary war" with Germany.

Other historians expressed differing views on the reasons for the Polish guarantee. The British historians Martin Gilbert and Richard Gott asserted in their 1963 book The Appeasers that the guarantee was given only in response to domestic objections to appeasement following the German invasion of Czechoslovakia on 15 March 1939. Wesley Wark has maintained that the guarantee was an intermediate stage between the commitments Chamberlain made to defend Western Europe in early 1939 for reasons of British national security and the moral crusade to destroy Germany that began with the outbreak of war in September 1939.

The American historian Anna M. Cienciala contended the guarantee to be merely another form of appeasement and argued that Chamberlain's motive in making the guarantee was to apply pressure on Poland to agree to return the Free City of Danzig to Germany. D.C. Watt, Andrew Roberts and Anita J. Prazmowska maintained that the guarantee was only an ineffectual and ill-thought deterrent that was meant to discourage Hitler from aggression. Maurice Cowling made a Primat der Innenpolitik ("primacy of domestic politics") argument by claiming the guarantee reflected domestic British party manoeuvring between the Conservative and Labour Parties and had nothing to do with foreign policy considerations

Additional reasons for the guarantee were suggested by the Canadian historian Bruce Strang, who argued that Chamberlain was increasingly convinced by March 1939, much as much he disliked the prospect, that a war with Germany was appearing increasingly inevitable and so Britain would need at least massive American economic support. Hints from US President Franklin Roosevelt suggested that he would not consider revising the Neutrality Acts unless Britain was seen be carrying out a more confrontational foreign policy. Simultaneously, the French, especially Foreign Minister Georges Bonnet, skilfully gave the impression of a country whose morale was rapidly collapsing and so needed a firmer British commitment to restore it, and the British were meanwhile attempting to persuade the French to make concessions to Italy to move Mussolini away from Hitler. A major crisis in French-Italian relations had started on 30 November 1938, when Mussolini ordered the Italian Chamber of Deputies to stage "spontaneous" demonstrations demanding that France cede Nice, Corsica, Tunisia and French Somaliland. To remove a potential enemy from the Axis camp, Chamberlain had generally urged the French to give in to the Italian demands, with much opposition from French Prime Minister Édouard Daladier. For Chamberlain, the Polish guarantee tied the French towards opposing Germany and allowed him freedom to continue pressuring the French to make concessions to Italy. In addition, Strang argued that widespread rumours in March 1939 of an imminent German move somewhere in Eastern Europe led to the need for some sort of dynamic British countermove to forestall another German coup, like those of 15 March against Czechoslovakia and 23 March, which saw a German ultimatum to Lithuania to return the Memelland at once. Finally, Strang noted that the most important reasons for the Polish guarantee were the exaggerated reports of German plans for an invasion of Romania, which had been spread by Tilea and led to fears that the seizure of oil-rich Romania would undercut any British blockade of Germany. A Poland tied to both Britain and Romania would deter a German move into the Balkans. Chamberlain was much influenced by advice from British military experts that Poland had the strongest army in Eastern Europe and so could pose a major threat to German expansionism.

== 1939: Containment policy ==
Confirming Chamberlain on his "containment" policy of Germany in 1939 was information supplied by Carl Friedrich Goerdeler to the effect that the German economy was on the verge of collapsing by the weight of heavy military spending. In addition, Goerdeler reported that Hitler could be deterred from war by a forceful British diplomatic stand in favour of Poland and that his regime would then collapse on its own accord by the disintegration of the German economy. Goerdeler's arguments had much influence on Chamberlain when he dealt with Hitler in 1939. In the so-called "X documents" (Goerdeler's codename was "X") detailing the German economic situation, Goerdeler painted a dire picture. In a typical report, Goerdeler told his contact with British intelligence, the industrialist A.P. Young: "Economic and financial situation gravely critical. Inner situation desperate. Economic conditions getting worse". In February 1939, Goerdeler's assessment of the German economic situation was contradicted by Frank Ashton-Gwatkin, the Foreign Office's economic expert, who reported to the Cabinet after he visited Germany that through Germany suffered from serious economic problems, the situation was nowhere near as desperate as portrayed by Goerdeler in the "X documents". As the British historian Richard Overy observed, Chamberlain much preferred Goerdeler's assessment of German economic problems over Ashton-Gwatkin's, whose views were ignored by Chamberlain in 1939. The accuracy of Goerdeler's information has been the subject of much historical debate, with some historians arguing that Goerdeler exaggerated the extent of German economic problems, but other historians have maintained that Goerdeler's information was correct and that Soviet economic support, together with plundering occupied countries, saved the German economy from collapse in 1939 to 1941.

The "containment" strategy comprised building a "peace front" of alliances linking Western and Eastern European states to serve as a "tripwire" to deter German aggression. The anchors of the proposed "peace front" meant to contain the Germany were supposed to be Britain, France, Poland, the Soviet Union and Turkey. The essence of the containment strategy was a policy of deterrence, with firm warnings against aggression and an attempt to form an interlocking network of alliances to block German aggression in any direction. Beginning with a proposal by Chamberlain in March 1939 and following advice from the Chiefs of Staff for talks between Britain, the Soviet Union, Poland and France to offer support for any state that felt its independence threatened by Hitler, the French suggested successfully that the proposal be stiffened to include action. Poland was invited into the proposed Four-Power Pact both as the state best placed to aid Romania and also as the East European state from which Romania was most likely to accept aid. Poland was at first conceived as merely one part of the anti-German East European bloc, but rumours presented by the newspaperman Ian Colvin, most likely planted by anti-Nazi elements within the Abwehr, of an impending German attack against Poland in late March led to the specific unilateral guarantee of Poland. Pointedly, the guarantee was of Polish independence, not integrity, which left open the possibility of territorial revision in Germany's favour. Though it was not practical for Britain to offer any aid to Poland in the event of a German attack, the principal motives were deterring a German attack against Poland and, if such an attack came, tying down German troops. Though Chamberlain envisioned the return of Danzig as the part of the ultimate solution to the German-Polish dispute, he also made very clear that the survival of a Polish state, within truncated borders, was seen as part of the solution. A further factor encouraging Britain to risk a war over Poland was the statements from the various dominion governments in the summer of 1939, with the exception of the Irish Free State, that unlike in 1938 they would go to war with Britain. Another factor was the state of the British economy and the financial problems of paying the colossal costs of rearmament. By May 1939, Simon was warning the Cabinet that under the economic strain of rearmament, "We shall find ourselves in a position, when we should be unable to wage any war other than a brief one". Given the economic strains caused by rearmament, Chamberlain greatly wanted an end to the endless crises gripping Europe before the arms race bankrupted Britain.

== Summer 1939: Tientsin incident ==
A major crisis that preoccupied Chamberlain in the summer of 1939 was the Tientsin Incident. The British refusal to hand over to the Japanese four Chinese nationalists accused of murdering a Japanese collaborator caused the British concession in Tianjin, China, to be blockaded by the Imperial Japanese Army on 14 June 1939. In particular, reports in the British press of the maltreatment by the Japanese of British subjects wishing to leave or to enter the concession, especially the public stripsearching of British women at bayonet-point by Japanese soldiers, enraged British public opinion and led to much pressure on the government to take action against Japan. Chamberlain considered the crisis to be so important that he ordered the Royal Navy to give greater attention to a possible war with Japan than to a war with Germany. On 26 June 1939, the Royal Navy reported that the only way of ending the blockade was to send the main British battle fleet to the Far East and that the current crisis in Europe of Germany threatening Poland made that militarily inadvisable. In addition, Chamberlain faced strong pressure from the French not to weaken British naval strength in the Mediterranean because of the danger that Mussolini might honour the Pact of Steel if war broke out in Europe. After an unsuccessful effort to obtain a promise of American support (the United States informed Britain that it would not risk a war with Japan purely for British interests), Chamberlain ordered Sir Robert Craigie, the British ambassador, to find any way of ending the crisis without too much loss of British prestige.

The crisis ended with the British handing over the Chinese suspects, who were executed by the Japanese in August 1939, but Craigie managed to persuade the Japanese to drop their more extreme demands, such as the British turning over all Chinese silver in British banks to the Japanese.

== Summer 1939: Last attempts at peace ==
By the summer of 1939, if Chamberlain did not welcome the prospect of war, there was a feeling that it was the best time to force Hitler into a settlement, and if that was impossible, it was the best time to wage war because of the economic problems associated with British rearmament. The Board of Trade's Oliver Stanley advised his Cabinet colleagues in July 1939, "There would, therefore, come a moment which, on a balance of our financial strength and strength in armaments, was the best time for war to break out". Though Chamberlain was firmly determined to resist aggression, he had not abandoned the prospect of appeasement and peaceful revision in the talks in London between the British Government's Chief Industrial Advisor, Sir Horace Wilson, a close friend and associate of Chamberlain, and Helmut Wohlat of the Four Year Plan Office in July 1939, Wilson made it clear that if Hitler abandoned his aggressive course against Poland, London would be willing to discuss the peaceful return of Danzig and the Polish Corridor, colonial restoration, economic concessions, disarmament and an Anglo-German commitment to refrain from war against each other, all of which was of absolutely no significance to Hitler. In the summer of 1939, there were desperate attempts to avert a war by various amateur diplomats such as Göring's deputy, Wohltat; Wilson; newspaper proprietor Lord Kemsley and would-be peace-makers like the Swedish businessmen Axel Wenner-Gren and Birger Dahlerus, who served as couriers between Hermann Göring, who had some private doubts about the wisdom of Hitler's policies and was anxious to see a compromise solution, and various British officials. All efforts at a compromise solution were doomed because Chamberlain demanded as the precondition for Hitler to abandon war against Poland as an option, and Hitler was absolutely determined to have a war with Poland. For Chamberlain, war remained the worst possible outcome to the Polish crisis, but he was determined to make a forceful British stand in favour of Poland, leading hopefully to a negotiated settlement of the Danzig crisis, which would result in a British diplomatic victory that would hopefully deter Hitler from a policy of force.

After the German occupation of Prague in March 1939, in violation of the Munich Agreement, the British government sought Soviet and French support for a Peace Front. The goal was to deter further German aggression by guaranteeing the independence of Poland and Romania. However, Stalin refused to pledge Soviet support for these guarantees unless Britain and France first concluded a military alliance with the Soviet Union. In London, the cabinet decided to seek such an alliance, but the western negotiators in Moscow in August 1939 lacked urgency. The talks were poorly and slowly conducted by diplomats with little authority, such as William Strang, an assistant undersecretary. Stalin also insisted on British and French guarantees to Finland, the Baltic states, Poland and Romania against indirect German aggression. Those countries, however, became fearful that Moscow wanted to control them. Although Hitler was escalating threats against Poland, it refused under any circumstances to allow Soviet troops to cross its borders. Historian Michael Jabara Carley argues that the British were too committed to anticommunism to trust Stalin. Meanwhile, Stalin was secretly negotiating with the Germans and was attracted to a much better deal by Hitler, control of most of Eastern Europe, and so decided to sign the Molotov–Ribbentrop Pact.

While Chamberlain attempted to broker a German–Polish compromise, he also stuck to his deterrence strategy of repeatedly warning Hitler that Britain would declare war on Germany if he attacked Poland. On 27 August 1939, Chamberlain sent the following letter to Hitler intended to counteract reports Chamberlain had heard from intelligence sources in Berlin that Joachim von Ribbentrop had convinced Hitler that the Molotov–Ribbentrop Pact would ensure that Britain would abandon Poland. In his letter to Hitler, Chamberlain wrote:

Whatever may prove to be the nature of the German–Soviet Agreement, it cannot alter Great Britain's obligation to Poland which His Majesty's Government have stated in public repeatedly and plainly and which they are determined to fulfill.

It has been alleged that, if His Majesty's Government had made their position more clear in 1914, the great catastrophe would have been avoided. Whether or not there is any force in that allegation, His Majesty's Government are resolved that on this occasion there shall be no such tragic misunderstanding.

If the case should arise, they are resolved, and prepared, to employ without delay all the forces at their command, and it is impossible to foresee the end of hostilities once engaged. It would be a dangerous illusion to think that, if war once starts, it will come to an early end even if a success on any one of the several fronts on which it will be engaged should have been secured.

Chamberlain remained hopeful up until Germany's invasion of the Low Countries that the war could be ended without serious fighting. He hoped that the British blockade would cause the collapse of the German economy and the regime. Once a new government was installed in Germany, it would be possible to make peace over issues "that we don't really care about". The policy has been widely criticised ever since, but the French General Staff was determined not to attack Germany but to remain on the strategic defensive. Thus, it is unclear what alternatives Chamberlain could have pursued. It is true that he used the months of the Phoney War to complete the development of the Spitfire and the Hurricane and to strengthen the RDF or radar defence grid in Britain. Both priorities would pay crucial dividends in the Battle of Britain.

== Outbreak of war ==
3 September 1939
Neville Chamberlain's speech (broadcast over the Wireless) declaring war on Germany.

On 1 September 1939, Germany invaded Poland. Once it became clear that it was an invasion, not another border incident (as had occurred before 1 September), Chamberlain wished to declare war on Germany at once. For the sake of Allied concord, Chamberlain wanted the British and the French declarations of war to be linked. The outbreak of war caused a serious crisis within the French Cabinet: a ferocious power struggle broke out between those, led by Foreign Minister Georges Bonnet, who were opposed to going to war with Germany, and those, led by Prime Minister Édouard Daladier who supported it. France's intentions were unclear as the Bonnet-Daladier power struggle was playing out and so the government only gave Germany an ultimatum: if Hitler withdrew his troops within two days, Britain would help to open talks between Germany and Poland. When Chamberlain announced that in the House of Commons on 2 September, there was a massive outcry. The prominent Conservative former minister Leo Amery, believing that Chamberlain had failed in his responsibilities, famously called on the acting Leader of the Opposition Arthur Greenwood to "Speak for England, Arthur!" Chief Whip David Margesson told Chamberlain that he believed the government would fall if war was not declared. After bringing further pressure on the French, who agreed to parallel the British action, Britain declared war on 3 September 1939.

In Chamberlain's radio broadcast to the nation, he said:

This morning the British Ambassador in Berlin handed the German Government a final note stating that, unless we heard from them by 11 o'clock that they were prepared at once to withdraw their troops from Poland, a state of war would exist between us. I have to tell you now that no such undertaking has been received, and that consequently this country is at war with Germany. You can imagine what a bitter blow it is to me that all my long struggle to win peace has failed. ... Up to the very last it would have been quite possible to have arranged a peaceful and honourable settlement between Germany and Poland. But Hitler would not have it; he had evidently made up his mind to attack Poland whatever happened. ... His action shows convincingly that there is no chance of expecting that this man will ever give up his practice of using force to gain his will. He can only be stopped by force, and we and France are today in fulfillment of our obligations going to the aid of Poland who is so bravely resisting this wicked and unprovoked attack upon her people. We have a clear conscience, we have done all that any country could do to establish peace, but a situation in which no word given by Germany's ruler could be trusted, and no people or country could feel itself safe, had become intolerable.

Chamberlain asked all his ministers to "place their offices in his hands" so that he could carry out a full-scale reconstruction of the government, which formed the Chamberlain war ministry. The most notable new recruits to the War Cabinet were Winston Churchill and the former Cabinet Secretary Maurice Hankey, now Baron Hankey. Former Foreign Secretary Anthony Eden rejoined the government as Dominions Secretary, a Cabinet-level post, but was not included in the small War Cabinet. Much of the press had campaigned for Churchill's return to government for several months, and taking him aboard looked like a good way to strengthen the government, especially since both the Labour Party and Liberal Party declined to join. Churchill became First Lord of the Admiralty. Chamberlain's inclusion of all three service ministers in the War Cabinet drew criticism from those who argued that a smaller cabinet of non-departmental ministers could take decisions more efficiently.

== War premiership ==
The first eight months of the war are often described as the "Phoney War" because of the relative lack of action. Throughout the period, the main conflicts took place at sea, which raised Churchill's public stature; however, many conflicts arose behind the scenes.

The Soviet invasion of Poland and then the Winter War between the Soviet Union and Finland led a call for military action against the Soviets, but Chamberlain believed that such action would be impossible unless the war with Germany was concluded peacefully, a course of action that he refused to countenance. The Moscow Peace Treaty in March 1940 brought no consequences in Britain, but the French government, led by Daladier, fell after a rebellion in the Chamber of Deputies. It was a worrying precedent for his ally Chamberlain.

Problems grew at the War Office as the Secretary of State for War, Leslie Hore-Belisha, became an increasingly-controversial figure. Hore-Belisha's high public profile and reputation as a radical reformer, who was turning the army into a modern fighting force, made him attractive to many, but he and the Chief of the Imperial General Staff, Lord Gort, soon lost confidence in each other in strategic matters. Hore-Belisha had also proved a difficult member of the War Cabinet, and Chamberlain realised that a change was needed; the Minister of Information, Lord Macmillan, had also proved ineffective, and Chamberlain considered moving Hore-Belisha to that post. Senior colleagues raised the objection that a Jewish Minister of Information would not benefit relations with neutral countries, and Chamberlain offered Hore-Belisha the post of President of the Board of Trade instead. Hore-Belisha refused and resigned from the government altogether. Since the true nature of the disagreement could not be revealed to the public, it seemed that Chamberlain had folded under pressure from traditionalist, inefficient generals who disapproved of Hore-Belisha's changes.

When Germany invaded Norway in April 1940, an expeditionary force was sent to counter them, but the campaign proved difficult, and the force had to be withdrawn. The naval aspect of the campaign in particular proved controversial and was to have repercussions in Westminster.

Chamberlain's war policy was the subject of such an impassioned debate that he is one of the very few prime ministers to have been named in a popular song. The 1938 song "God Bless You, Mr Chamberlain" expresses support:

God bless you, Mr Chamberlain,
we are all mighty proud of you.
You look swell holding your umbrella,
all the world loves a wonderful fellow ...

== Fall and resignation ==
Following the debacle of the British expedition to Norway, Chamberlain found himself under siege in the House of Commons. During the Norway Debate of 7 May, Leo Amery, who had been one of Chamberlain's personal friends, delivered a devastating indictment of Chamberlain's conduct of the war. In concluding his speech, he quoted the words of Oliver Cromwell to the Rump Parliament:

You have sat too long here for any good you have been doing. Depart, I say, and let us have done with you. In the name of God, go.

When the vote came the next day, over 40 government backbenchers voted against the government, and many more abstained. Although the government won the vote, Chamberlain would clearly have to meet the charges brought against him. He initially tried to bolster his government by offering to appoint some prominent Conservative rebels and to sacrifice some unpopular ministers, but demands for an all-party coalition government grew louder. Chamberlain set about investigating whether or not he could persuade the Labour Party to serve under him and, if not, who should succeed him.

Two obvious successors soon emerged: Lord Halifax, who was then Foreign Minister, and Winston Churchill. Halifax would have proved acceptable to almost everyone but was deeply reluctant to accept, arguing that it was impossible for a member of the House of Lords to lead an effective government. Over the next 24 hours, Chamberlain explored the situation further. That afternoon, he met with Halifax, Churchill and Margesson, who determined that if Labour declined to serve under Chamberlain, Churchill would have to try to form a government. Labour leaders Clement Attlee and Arthur Greenwood were unable to commit their party and agreed to put two questions to the next day's meeting of the National Executive Committee. Would they join an all-party government under Chamberlain? If not, would they join an all-party government under "someone else"?

The next day, Germany invaded the Netherlands, Belgium and France. At first, Chamberlain believed that it was best for him to remain in office for the duration of the crisis, but opposition to his continued premiership was such that at a meeting of the War Cabinet, Lord Privy Seal Sir Kingsley Wood told him clearly that it was time to form an all-party government. Soon afterwards, a response came from the Labour National Executive. It would not serve with Chamberlain but would serve with someone else. On the evening of 10 May 1940, Chamberlain tendered his resignation to the King and formally recommended Churchill as his successor.

== See also ==
- Causes of World War II
- Diplomatic history of World War II
- Invasion of Poland
- International relations (1919–1939)
