= Robert Hankey, 2nd Baron Hankey =

British diplomat and public servant

The Right Honourable The Lord Hankey KCMG KCVO

British Ambassador to Sweden
- In office 1954–1960
- Preceded by: Sir Roger Stevens
- Succeeded by: Sir John Coulson

Personal details
- Born: 4 July 1905
- Died: 28 October 1996 (aged 91)
- Spouse(s): (1) Frances Stuart-Menteth (d. 1957) (2) Joanna Wright (d.1991)
- Education: New College, Oxford

Robert Maurice Alers Hankey, 2nd Baron Hankey, KCMG, KCVO (4 July 1905 – 28 October 1996) was a British diplomat and public servant.

== Background and education ==
Born on 4 July 1905, Hankey was the eldest son of Maurice Hankey, 1st Baron Hankey, and Adeline, daughter of Abraham de Smidt, of South Africa. He was educated at Rugby and New College, Oxford.

== Diplomatic career ==
Hankey was appointed to be a Third Secretary in 1928, a Second Secretary in 1932, and a First Secretary in 1939. He then served as the Envoy to Hungary from 1951 to 1953 and the Ambassador to Sweden between 1954 and 1960.

Hankey was a delegate to the Organisation for Economic Co-operation (renamed the Organisation for Economic Co-operation and Development (OECD) in 1961) between 1960 and 1965. He succeeded his father in the barony in 1963 and became a very active member of the House of Lords, speaking 552 times between 1965 and his last speech in December 1991 at the age of 86. Hankey was also involved in business and served as a director of the Alliance Building Society from 1970 to 1983. He was president of the Anglo-Swedish Society around 1970.

== Family ==
Lord Hankey was twice married. He married firstly Frances Bevyl, daughter of Walter Erskine Stuart-Menteth, in 1930. They had two sons and two daughters. After her death in 1957 he married secondly Joanna, daughter of Reverend James Johnstone Wright, in 1962. Lord Hankey died in October 1996, aged 91, and was succeeded in the barony by his eldest son, Donald. He was also father of Adele Änggård.

== Honours ==
Hankey was appointed to the Order of St Michael and St George as a Companion in the 1947 New Year Honours and promoted to a Knight Commander of the same Order in the 1955 New Year Honours. Sir Robert was appointed to the Royal Victorian Order as a Knight Commander in 1956, as well as being awarded the Grand Cross of the Order of the Polar Star of Sweden.

Diplomatic posts
Preceded by Geoffrey Wallinger	British Minister to Hungary; 1951–1953	Succeeded by George Labouchère
Preceded by Sir Roger Stevens	British Ambassador to Sweden; 1954–1960	Succeeded by Sir John Coulson
Peerage of the United Kingdom
Preceded by Maurice Pascal Alers Hankey	Baron Hankey; 1963–1996	Succeeded by Donald Robin Alers Hankey
