= List of recipients of the Terence Judd Award =

This page is a list of known winners of the Terence Judd Award, which was set up in memory of the British pianist Terence Judd '...to further the careers of outstanding young professional pianists....'

Year	Pianist
1982	Stephen Hough
1985	Karoly Mocsari
1990	Kevin Kenner
1992	Benedetto Lupo
1995	Nikolai Lugansky
1996	Katya Apekisheva
1999	Momo Kodama
2005	Martin Sturfalt
2009	Michael McHale
2025	Julius Asal

Another apparent winner is the pianist Philip Hosford, though the year he won is unclear.
