= XII International Chopin Piano Competition =

Piano competition (1990)

The Twelfth International Fryderyk Chopin Piano Competition
- Date: 1–20 October 1990
- Venue: National Philharmonic, Warsaw
- Hosted by: Fryderyk Chopin Society
- Winner: not awarded

The XII International Chopin Piano Competition (Polish: XII Międzynarodowy Konkurs Pianistyczny im. Fryderyka Chopina) was held from 1 to 20 October 1990 in Warsaw. For the first time in the history of the competition, the first prize was not awarded.

== Awards ==
The competition consisted of three stages and a final. For the first time in the history of the competition, there was no winner. Musicologist Janusz Ekiert recalled: "The 12th Competition passed without any manifestations of great admiration and without any great controversy. Youngsters did not choose their idols, and the favourites failed to ignite people's imagination. One was hard pressed to notice any of the feverishly sparkling eyes that one remembered from previous competitions. No one in the audience fainted from emotion; if anyone, only a pianist."

The following prizes were awarded:

Prize	Winner	
1st place, gold medalist(s)	not awarded	
2nd place, silver medalist(s)	Kevin Kenner	United States
3rd place, bronze medalist(s)	Yukio Yokoyama	Japan
4th	Corrado Rollero	Italy
4th	Margarita Shevchenko	Soviet Union
5th	Anna Malikova	Soviet Union
5th	Takako Takahashi	Japan
6th	Caroline Sageman	France
HM	Hiroshi Arimori	Japan
HM	Philippe Giusiano	France
HM	Koji Oikawa	Japan
HM	Kyoko Tabe	Japan

Three special prizes were awarded:

Special prize	Winner	
Best Performance of a Concerto	not awarded	
Best Performance of Mazurkas	not awarded	
Best Performance of a Polonaise	Kevin Kenner	United States
Best Performance of a Polonaise	Wojciech Świtała	Poland

== Jury ==
The jury consisted of:

- (Soviet Union) Vladimir Ashkenazy ( (silver) V)
- (Poland) Ryszard Bakst
- (Poland) Halina Czerny-Stefańska ( (gold) IV)
- (People's Republic of Bulgaria) Anton Dikov
- (Soviet Union) Sergei Dorensky
- (Poland) Jan Ekier (chairman)
- (United States) Leon Fleisher
- (Poland) Lidia Grychtołówna
- (Poland) Barbara Hesse-Bukowska ( (silver) IV)
- (Poland) Andrzej Jasiński
- (Luxembourg) Cyprien Katsaris
- (Czechoslovakia) Ivan Klánský
- (Japan) Hiroko Nakamura
- (West Germany) Gerhard Oppitz
- (Poland) Piotr Paleczny
- (France) Bernard Ringeissen
- (Italy) Maria Tipo
- (Belgium) Eugène Traey (vice chairman)
- (Soviet Union) Lev Vlassenko (vice chairman)
- (Japan) Kazuko Yasukawa
- (Poland) Tadeusz Żmudziński
