= Adele Änggård =

British-Swedish stage and costume designer (1933–2023)

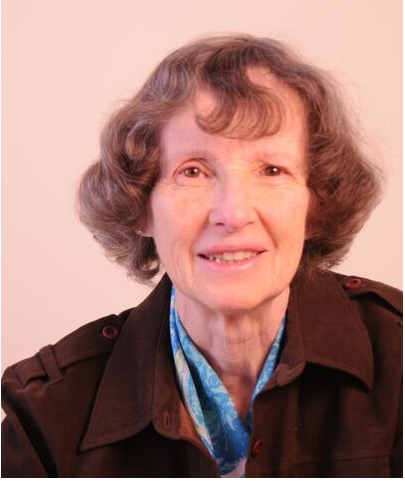
- Born: Adele Hankey; 31 July 1933
- Died: 3 November 2023 (aged 90); Stockholm, Sweden
- Occupations: Stage designer, costume designer
- Notable work: A Humanitarian Past
- Parent: Robert Hankey, 2nd Baron Hankey

Adele Änggård (née Hankey; 31 July 1933 – 3 November 2023) was a Swedish-British stage and costume designer whose career spanned some of the most significant major stages across Europe and Scandinavia. In parallel she actively pursued archeology and writing, and in later life contributed new interpretations on early European civilizations.

== Background and education ==
Adele Hankey was daughter of Robert Hankey, 2nd Baron Hankey. From 1948 to 1953 she studied ballet at the Elmhurst Ballet School with a focus on art and design, as well as theatre at the Guildhall School of Music and Drama. From 1960 to 1963 she took a series of design courses under Paul Colin, and studied art at the Académie Julian and with André Lhote at his studio. In 1972 she studied television and film at the College of San Mateo.

== Career ==
Änggård had a long and prolific career in theatre, contributing to some 80 productions between 1957 and 2000. Her designs were often noted for an essential simplicity, which integrated the visual part of a performance with the drama and acting as a whole.

=== Prominent opera productions ===
- Mäster Pedros Marionetter, Drottningholm Palace Theatre (1957) directed by Göran Gentele
- The Bear (1978)
- Il Pastor Fido, National Opera, Oslo (1979)
- Les Mamelles de Tiresias, Oslo (1980)
- Paris and Helena, Drottningholm Palace Theatre (1987)
- La Bohème (1994) directed by Bengt Peterson
- Väntarna/Herkules, Royal Swedish Opera (1995)
- Noye's Fludde, Vasa Museum (1995)

=== Prominent ballet productions ===
- Coppelia, Royal Swedish Ballet (1958) choreographed by Mary Skeaping
- While the Spider Slept, Royal Swedish Ballet (1966) and Royal Winnipeg Ballet (1967) choreographed by Brian Macdonald
- Kampen om kungakronan, Nyköping, Malmö City Theatre and SVT (1987) choreographed by Birgit Cullberg

=== Prominent theatrical productions ===
- King Lear, Royal Shakespeare Company (assistant designer, 1962) directed by Peter Brook
- Serjeant Musgrave's Dance (1962)
- The Deputy (Le Vicaire) (1963)
- Hamlet (1991) directed by Anita Blom
- Othello (1992)
- Ion (1993)
- Vintergatan (1995) directed by Harald Leander
- The Oresteia, Skillinge theatre (1996) directed by Anita Blom
- Don Juan, Skillinge theatre (2000) directed by Mario Gonzales

=== Film production ===
- King Lear (1971), directed by Peter Brook

== Archaeology ==
In parallel to her theatre career she developed a lifetime interest in ancient Greece and archaeology, starting in childhood with archaeologist Vronwy Hankey, a Minoan and Mycenae specialist and included visits to the caves of Altamira and Lascaux. Later, as an extension of her theatrical career – so as to better understand Greek play scripts – she studied archaeology at Södertörn University, receiving a bachelor's degree.

Following extensive research, she published A Humanitarian Past in 2016. The book adds a sophisticated social dimension to early European history, and challenges modern conceptualizations of the earliest European ancestors as being underdeveloped and prehistoric art as primitive.

== Death ==
Adele Änggård died on 3 November 2023, at the age of 90.
