= Baron Hankey =

Barony in the Peerage of the United Kingdom

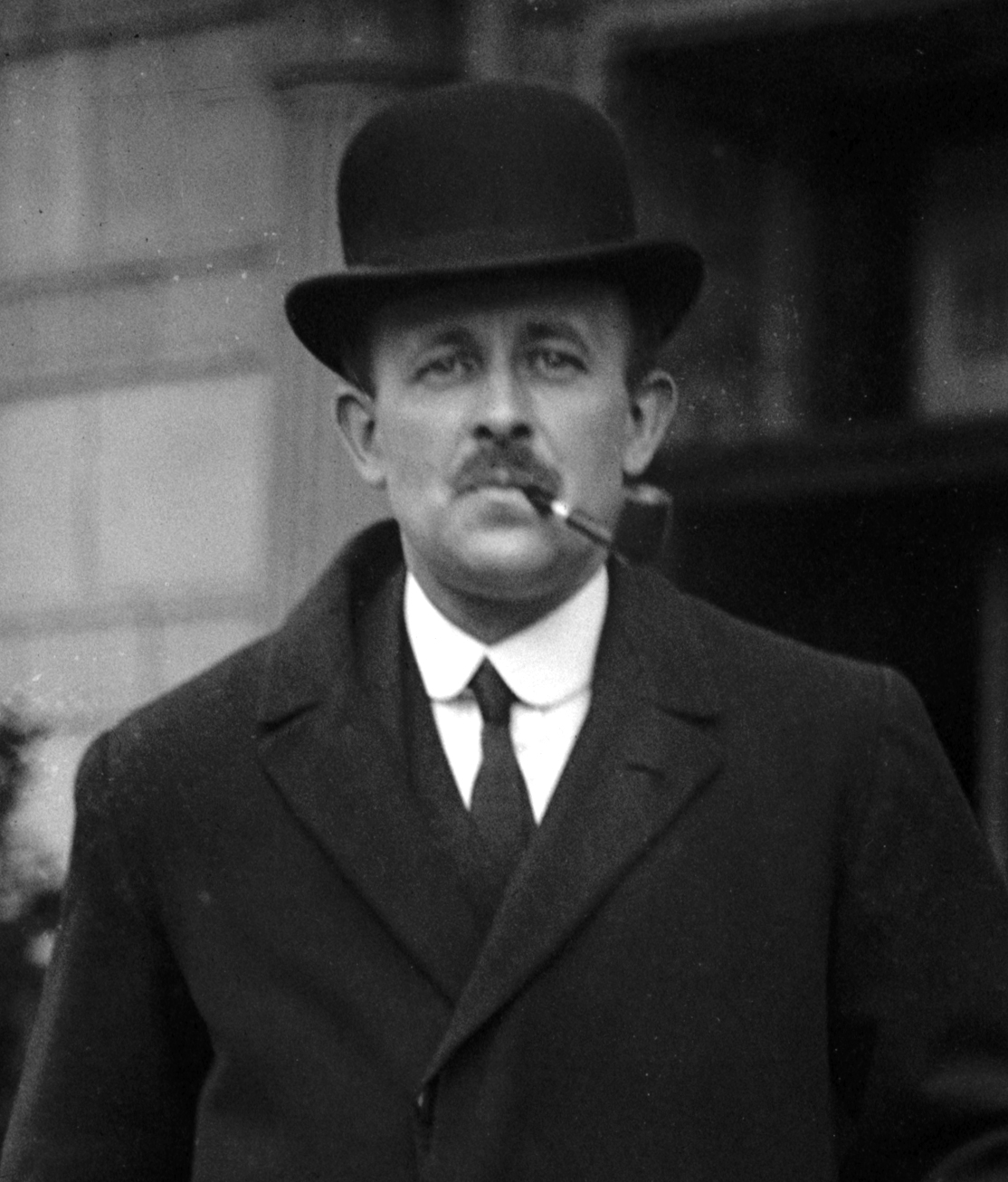
Maurice Hankey, 1st Baron Hankey

Baron Hankey, of The Chart in the County of Surrey, is a title in the Peerage of the United Kingdom. It was created in 1939 for the civil servant Sir Maurice Hankey, Cabinet Secretary from 1920 to 1938. His eldest son, the second Baron, was a diplomat and served as British Ambassador to Sweden between 1954 and 1960. As of 2016 the title is held by the latter's eldest son, the third Baron, who succeeded in 1996. He is an architect.

Donald Hankey, brother of the first Baron, was a soldier best known for two volumes of essays about the British volunteer army in the First World War. The Hon. Henry Hankey, third son of the first Baron, was British Ambassador to Panama between 1966 and 1969.

== Baron Hankey (1939) ==
- Maurice Pascal Alers Hankey, 1st Baron Hankey (1877–1963)
- Robert Maurice Alers Hankey, 2nd Baron Hankey (1905–1996)
- Donald Robin Alers Hankey, 3rd Baron Hankey (b. 1938)

The heir presumptive to the title is the present holder's younger brother, the Hon. Alexander Maurice Alers Hankey (b. 1947).
