= John Coulson (diplomat) =

British diplomat

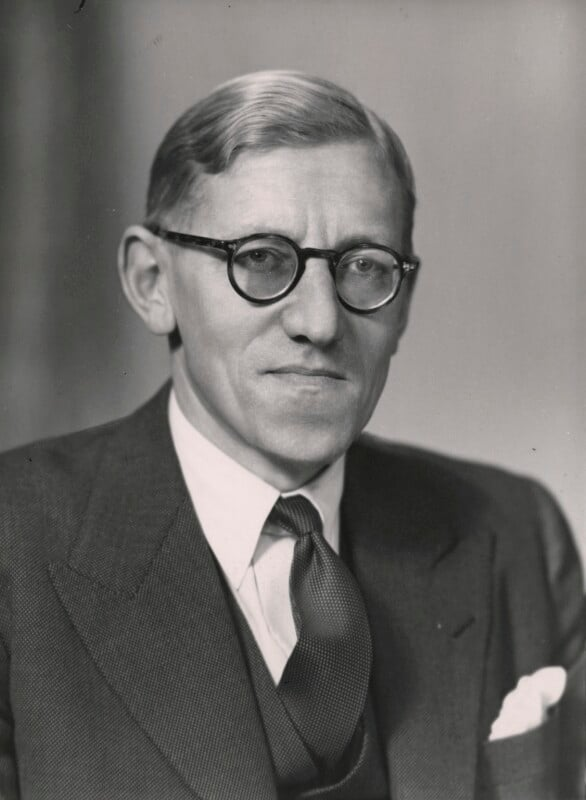
Coulson in 1952

Sir John Eltringham Coulson KCMG (1909–1997) was a British diplomat who was ambassador to Sweden and secretary-general of EFTA.

Coulson was born 13 September 1909. He was educated at Rugby School and Corpus Christi College, Cambridge. He joined the Diplomatic Service in 1932. He served at Bucharest, Paris, New York and Washington, D.C., before being appointed Ambassador to Sweden 1960–1963. He was then Deputy Under-Secretary of State at the Foreign Office 1963–1965, Chief of Administration of HM Diplomatic Service briefly from January to September 1965, and Secretary-General of the European Free Trade Association 1965–1972. He died 15 November 1997.

== Honours ==
John Coulson was appointed a Companion of the Order of St Michael and St George (CMG) in the 1946 Birthday Honours and promoted to Knight Commander of the Order (KCMG) in the 1957 Birthday Honours. The Swedish government made him a Knight Grand Cross of the Order of the Polar Star.

Diplomatic posts
| Preceded by Sir Robert Hankey | Ambassador Extraordinary and Plenipotentiary at Stockholm; 1960–1963 | Succeeded by Sir Moore Crosthwaite |
| Preceded by Frank Figgures | Secretary-General of the European Free Trade Association; 1965–1972 | Succeeded by Bengt Rabaeus |
