= Terence Judd =

English pianist (1957–1979)

Terence Judd (3 October 1957 – between 16 and 23 December 1979) was an English pianist.

== Career ==
Terence Judd was born in 1957 to English-American parents, Anthony and Gloria Judd. In 1967, aged 10, he won the National Junior Pianoforte Competition, and came to the attention of Eileen Joyce, who supported and encouraged him. He also studied with Maria Curcio, the last and favourite pupil of Artur Schnabel. In London he also studied with Ezra Rachlin (1915–1995). Known particularly for his championship of virtuosic romantic works, above all the music of Franz Liszt, he brought a characteristic exuberance and clarity of expression to his performances; and his recordings bear witness to that. His renditions of Alberto Ginastera's Piano Sonata No. 1 and Samuel Barber's Piano Sonata in E♭ minor are exemplary for other pianists, and his memorable performances of Tchaikovsky's Piano Concerto No. 1 and Prokofiev's Piano Concerto No. 3, which he played back-to-back in the finals of the 1978 Tchaikovsky Competition, are among the most exciting of these well-known virtuosic works. He was awarded joint 4th Prize, with Boris Petrov.

== Death ==
Shortly before he was due to embark on a six-concert tour of the Soviet Union, Judd left his parents' Brondesbury Park home in north-west London after Sunday lunch on 16 December 1979, telling them he was going for a walk. A week later, on 23 December, his body was found washed up on the beach at the foot of Beachy Head. There was a one-way train ticket in his pocket, which was seen as evidence he had not intended returning. At the coroner's inquest, his general practitioner testified that he had treated Judd for depression in February 1979. Earlier in his life, Judd had suffered a nervous breakdown and spent several months at a clinic in north London, where he received ECT. The coroner delivered an open verdict, but it is generally accepted that Judd took his own life.

His family scattered his ashes in Hawaii, a place he had long desired to visit.

The Terence Judd Award is given in his honour.

== Selected discography ==
Judd produced a number of recordings for Chandos Records, including:

- . Includes the Ginastera and Barber sonatas mentioned above as well as Liszt, Shostakovich and Ravel.
- . Predominantly Liszt (including the Sonata in B minor) as well as some Chopin.
- . A more classical selection, with Bach, Scarlatti and Haydn as well as some romantic works.
- . The concertos mentioned above, recorded in the Tchaikovsky Competition.
