= Caroline Sageman =

French classical pianist

Caroline Sageman (born 29 August 1973) is a French classical pianist.

== Biography ==
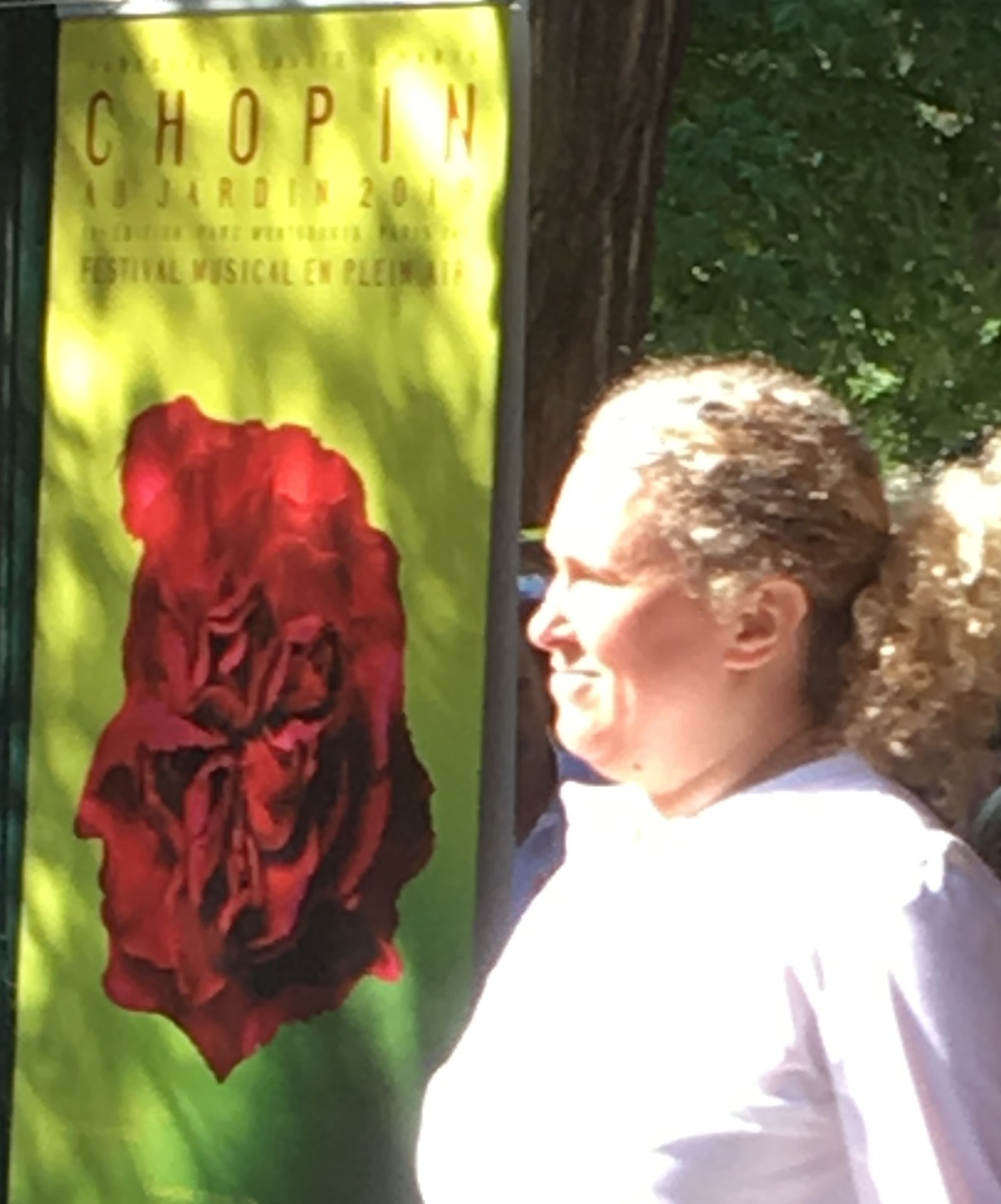

Sageman was an precocious child: she took her first piano lessons at the age of 6 with Denyse Rivière, Marcel Ciampi's assistant and Jean-Marc Luisada teacher. At 9, with the Orchestre Philharmonique de Radio France, she performed the piano concerto in D major by Haydn at the Salle Pleyel. She entered the Conservatoire de Paris at the age of 13 in the class of Germaine Mounier. She was only seventeen when she won the 6th prize of the XII International Chopin Piano Competition in Warsaw, making her the youngest winner of this competition since its inception. Among her major professional meetings, are those of Claudio Arrau, Miłosz Magin, Hubert Guillard, Merces De Silva Telles, Nikita Magaloff, Yevgeny Malinin and Eugen Indjic. She then performed abroad, notably in Japan, Italy and Switzerland, and in France. She has worked with, among others, conductors Pierre Dervaux and Jean-François Paillard. She also performs in chamber ensembles, in particular with Faustine Tremblay (violin), Bertrand Braillard (cello), Jean Ferrandis (flute), Dominique de Williencourt (cello), and David Galoustov (violin).

A specialist of Chopin and Liszt, she imagined in 2010 the musical show Chopin, Musset, les doubles romantiques with singer Patrick Bruel. The reading of excerpts from Alfred de Musset's Confessions of a Child of the Century and The Nights alternates with pieces by Frédéric Chopin that she performs.

She also approaches the contemporary repertoire and has created works by Arnaud Petit, Françoise Choveaux and Bruno Giner, who dedicated to her his play Après une lecture de...

In parallel to her concert activities, Caroline Sageman is the assistant to Jean-Marc Luisada at the École normale de musique de Paris Alfred Cortot and teaches at the Conservatory of Blanc-Mesnil (93).

== Prizes ==
- 1982: First Prize of the "Royaume de la Musique"
- 1990: 6th prize at the XII International Chopin Piano Competition

== Discography ==
- Franz Liszt (Lyrinx, 2004)
  - Sonata in B minor (dedicated to Robert Schumann)
  - Obermann Valley (First year of pilgrimage: Switzerland)
  - Rêve d’amour No 3 of the Liebesträume
  - Saint-François de Paule marchant sur les flots (Legends, No 2)
- Frédéric Chopin (Lyrinx, 2002)
  - Sonata in B flat minor, Op. 35
  - Scherzos
    - No 1 in B minor, Op. 20
    - No 2 in B flat minor, Op. 31
    - No 3 in C sharp minor, Op. 39
    - No 4 in E major, Op. 54
- Tibor Harsányi's L'Histoire du petit tailleur and Camille Saint-Saëns's The Carnival of the Animals, by Smaïn (narrator) under the direction of Yannis Pouspourikas. Pianists: Caroline Sageman and Lidija Bizjak (Lyrinx, 2008)
- Frédéric Chopin (Lyrinx, 2011)
  - Polonaise-Fantaisie
  - Andante spianato
  - Grande Polonaise
- Ludwig van Beethoven (Lyrinx, 2012)
  - Complete Sonatas for violin and piano, with David Galoustov.
