= Kevin Kenner =

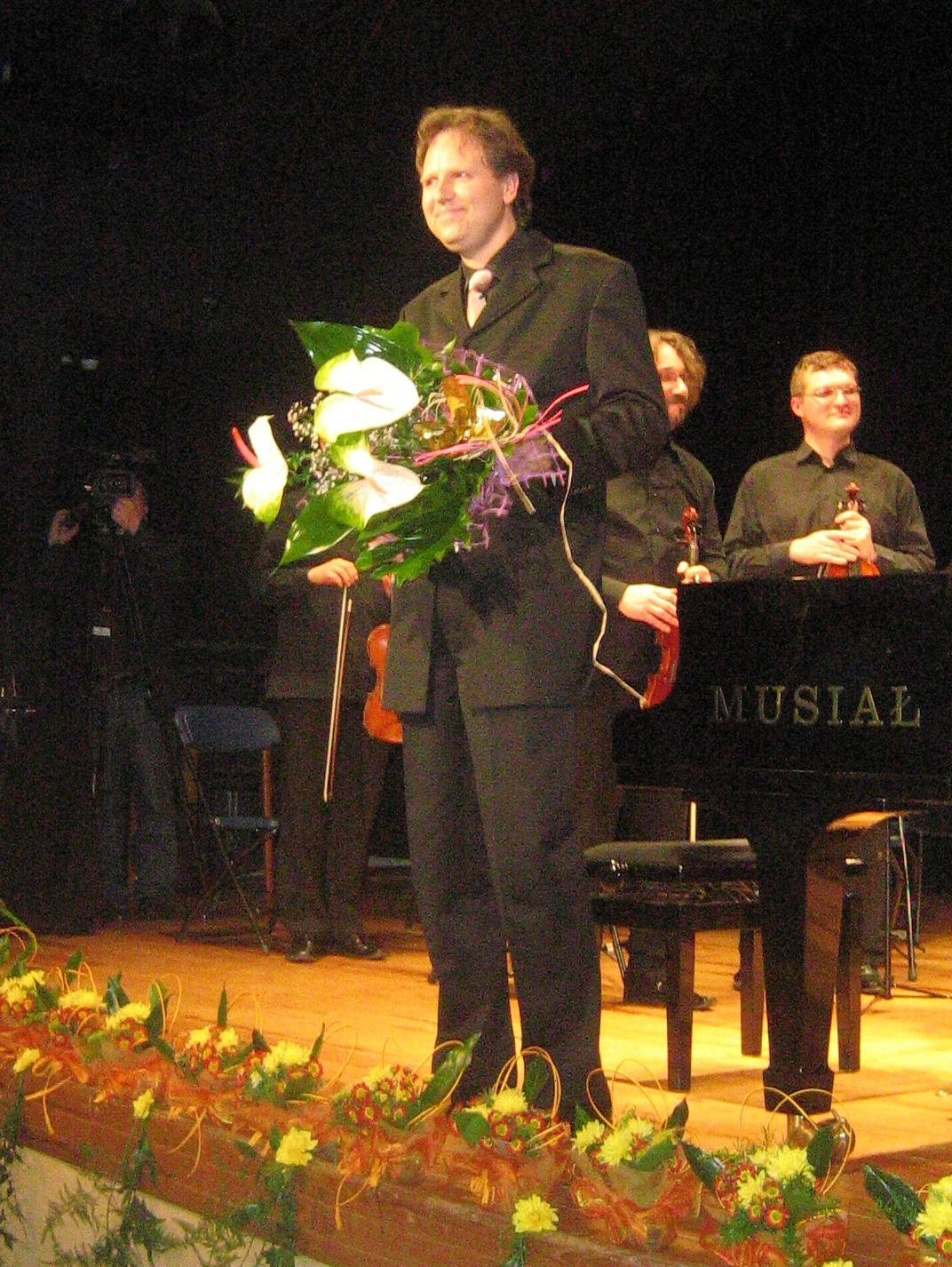
- Kevin Kenner in Misdroy (2009)

Background information
- Born: May 19, 1963 (age 63); Coronado, California
- Genres: Classical music
- Occupations: Musician, concert pianist
- Instrument: Piano
- Website: Official website

Kevin Kenner (born May 19, 1963, in Coronado, California) is an American concert pianist.

== Biography ==
At the age of 17, Kenner was a finalist at the X International Chopin Piano Competition in Warsaw. Ten years later, in 1990 he returned to Warsaw and achieved second place at the XII International Chopin Piano Competition and the Special Prize for the Best Performance of a Polonaise. No first prize was awarded that year. Earlier that year he won the third prize at the International Tchaikovsky Competition in Moscow. Other awards include the International Terence Judd Award (London, 1990), prize for Best Performance of Chamber Music (shared with three others) at the 1989 Van Cliburn International Piano Competition, and the Gina Bachauer International Piano Competition (Salt Lake City, Utah 1988).

Kenner has since performed as soloist with world class orchestras including the Hallé Orchestra, the BBC Symphony Orchestra, the Berlin Symphony Orchestra, the Warsaw Philharmonic, The Czech Philharmonic, the Belgian Radio and Television Philharmonic Brussels, the NHK Symphony Orchestra, and in the US with the principal orchestras of San Francisco, San Diego, Salt Lake City, Kansas City, New Jersey, Rochester, Baltimore, St. Paul and many others. He has been invited to work with many renowned conductors, including Sir Charles Groves, Sir Andrew Davis, Hans Vonk, Stanislaw Skrowaczewski, Jerzy Maksymiuk, Kazimierz Kord, Jiri Belohlavek and Antoni Wit.

His achievements have won him critical acclaim from all over the world. He has been praised as "one of the finest American pianists to come along in years" (Howard Reich, Chicago Tribune), "...fulfilling a criterion which one only knows from great Chopinists such as Rubinstein, Benedetti-Michelangeli and Dinu Lipatti" (Winfried Wild, Schwaebische Zeitung, Germany). Adrian Jack of London's Independent describes one of Kenner's recitals as "...the best performance I have ever heard in the concert hall of all four of Chopin's Ballades". The Financial Times in London described Kenner as a "player of grace, subtle variety and strength, with a mature grasp of dramatic structure and proportion: in short, a grown-up musician nearing his peak." And the Washington Post recently proclaimed him "a major talent ... an artist whose intellect, imagination and pianism speak powerfully and eloquently." The conductor Stanislaw Skrowaczewski, who recorded with pianists such as Arthur Rubinstein, claimed Kenner's Chopin interpretations to be the most sensitive and beautiful he remembered.

He has performed chamber music with the Tokyo String Quartet, the Endellion String Quartet, the Vogler String Quartet and the Panocha Quartet, among many others. He has toured with the Piazzoforte String Quintet, performing arrangements of Ástor Piazzolla.

Along with his concert appearances, Kenner has given masterclasses for many years at the International Piano Festival in Krynica, Poland as well as in major centres in Japan and America. More recently he has been giving classes at the International Summer Music Academy in Kraków, Poland. He has also been invited to adjudicate in international music competitions in Asia, Europe and the US. Since 2001 he has been engaged as a professor of piano at the Royal College of Music, London, and some of his students have gone on to win prizes in international piano competitions. Since 2011, when he met violinist Kyung-wha Chung at the Great Mountains Festival, they have created a performance partnership. They have worked together on an album and had multiple tours.

Kevin Kenner's recordings include many discs of Chopin works as well as recordings of Ravel, Schumann and Piazzolla. The latter was awarded a "Fryderyk" in Poland in 2012 as best CD of the year under the category Chamber Music.

Kenner was a member of the jury at the XVI International Chopin Piano Competition in 2010, the XVIII International Chopin Piano Competition in 2021, and served on the jury again at the XIX International Chopin Piano Competition in 2025.

== Recordings ==
Kevin has made numerous recordings, including those of Chopin's Ballades, Preludes, and both Piano Concertos, with conductor Antoni Wit and the National Philharmonic Orchestra of Poland. In 2007, he also released a recording of various works by Maurice Ravel.
