= Anglo-Swedish Society =

- London; England

Information
- Type: Charity
- Established: 1919
- Patrons: HM King Charles III, Carl XVI Gustaf of Sweden, the Swedish Ambassador to the Court of St James
- Chairman: Alexander Malmaeus
- Website: http://www.angloswedishsociety.org.uk/

Founded in the aftermath of the First World War, the Anglo-Swedish Society was established to foster greater understanding and friendship between Britain and Sweden. The continued strong bond between these two nations has allowed the Society to evolve into a non-profit organisation that promotes intellectual and cultural crossover by organising prestigious events and supporting scholarships of the arts. A bridge in the English and Swedish calendars, the Anglo-Swedish Society in London has celebrated the strong bond between the two nations since 1918.

== History ==
The Society was founded in 1918, and set up an office with club room and library at 10 Staple Inn, High Holborn. Its first patrons were Crown Prince Gustaf Adolf of Sweden, Prince Arthur, Duke of Connaught and Strathearn, Count Herman Wrangel, Sir Esme Howard and Baron Erik Palmstierna.

The Anglo-Swedish Society was one of several Anglo-European Societies established immediately after the First World War to promote greater understanding and friendship between nations. The impulse was clear: never again!

The Society's first chairman, Sir Henry Penson, explained that it had been formed "to promote intellectual intercourse between the peoples of the British Empire and Sweden, assistance in arranging an interchange in educational facilities and the encouragement of reciprocal travel". From an early stage, successful applicants were awarded travel stipends to undertake "a definite course of study". These applicants tended to be from the Universities of Oxford or Cambridge.

In the two years after the establishment of the Anglo-Swedish Society in London, sister organisations were set up in Sweden: the British-Swedish Society in Stockholm in 1919 and the Anglo-Swedish Society in Gothenburg in 1920. The three worked closely together, and helped each other set up lending libraries. Summer holiday courses were soon organised in Sweden, comprising the "Swedish language, physical culture and gymnastics". The courses received support from members of the Swedish Royal family and business enterprises in Sweden, who placed their houses and hospitality at the disposal of the Society.

A the Society provided an information service for Swedish visitors to London was also provided. By the 1930s, a thriving exchange programme between British and Swedish school children had been established.

In 1922, the Swedish Travel Association (also founded 1918) was amalgamated with the Anglo-Swedish Society. Its aims were to "afford opportunities for Swedish journalists to visit the United Kingdom".

In 1924, an exhibition of Swedish art principally of the 1880s and 90s was exhibited at Burlington House. The exhibition was a collaboration of the Royal Academy of Art and the Anglo-Swedish Society. Some 400 paintings and sculptures were shown. Artists included Prince Eugen, Anders Zorn, Bruno Liljefors and Carl Larsson.

In 1931, Sir Harold Wernher, president of the Anglo-Swedish Society, presided over the Swedish Exhibition of Industrial Arts and Crafts at Dorland House, Lower Regent Street. It was inspired by the internationally renowned Stockholm Exhibition of 1930. The Anglo-Swedish Society was joint co-ordinator.

In April 1933, the Swedish composer Hugo Alfvén conducted the New Symphony Orchestra playing his own works at the Palladium. This was the composer's first visit to the UK. The event was presided over by Princess Helena Victoria of Schleswig-Holstein, the Swedish Minister and the Anglo-Swedish Society.

In 1933 Prince George (later George VI) was present at an Anglo-Swedish Society reception in honour of the Nobel Prize winners of Great Britain and Ireland. Among the many famous names were Rudyard Kipling, George Bernard Shaw and W. B. Yeats.

The annual dinners of the Anglo-Swedish Society were generally held in the late autumn, and it was common for members of the British and Swedish Royal families to be present. Crown Prince Gustav Adolf (later King Gustav VI Adolf) and Crown Princess Louise attended frequently. Crown Princess Louise was formerly Lady Louise Mountbatten, Earl Mountbatten's sister. Prince Philip, Queen Louise's nephew and Patron of the Society, has been a keen supporter of the Society's events for several decades. In November 1934, Anthony Eden (then under-secretary for foreign affairs, 1955–57 Prime Minister) spoke about trade relations between Britain and Sweden at the Society's annual dinner.

In addition to its own annual dinners, joint events were held most years from the 1920s to the 1960s with the Swedish BV Society ("Sällskapet Bärsärkar & Vikingar"). The most regular were the ones in honour of the birthday of King Gustaf V and later of King Gustaf VI Adolf. The president ("Jarl") of BV generally presided while the chairman of the Anglo-Swedish Society and his wife received the guests. In June 1951, Vice-Admiral Earl Mountbatten of Burma and Countess Mountbatten attended a ball at the May Fair Hotel held by the Anglo-Swedish Society and the BV Society in honour of the officers and mid-shipmen of the Swedish Home Fleet then visiting the UK.

In March 1953, the Society held a reception in honour of Dag Hammarskjöld, Secretary-General of the United Nations.

In 1954 and 2004, the Society held balls at the Dorchester Hotel to celebrate the Treaty of Friendship between England and Sweden, probably the oldest trade treaty in Britain's history. At the former event, the principal speaker was the Minister of State for Foreign Affairs, Profumo. At the latter, the King and Queen of Sweden, Prince Philip, Archbishop KG Hammar and 350 members of the Swedish colony in the UK attended.

In June 1969, the Society held its fiftieth anniversary dinner at the Dorchester Hotel. The guests of honour were the Ambassadors of Sweden, Denmark and Finland, Admiral of the Fleet Earl Mountbatten of Burma, Archbishop Emeritus Hultgren, the First Sea Lord and Lady Fanu and other dignitaries. This anniversary was mistakenly celebrated a year late, and the confusion is likely to have arisen from the fact that the Swedish-British Society was established in Stockholm in 1919.

The chronological anachronism was perpetuated as late as May 2009, when the Swedish Ambassador, Staffan Carlsson held an elegant dinner for members and benefactors of the Society at his Residence. The Society's musical Scholars provided entertainment.

== Scholarships ==
The Scholarships & Awards Fund was established in 2002 to provide scholarships and academic support together with grants for similar purposes.

=== List of Scholars ===
Name	Year/s supported	Discipline	Information
Susanna Andersson	2003-2004	Music – Soprano	Soprano who received support during her studies at the Guildhall School of Music & Drama in London. While at the Guildhall Susanna won the prestigious Gold Medal Competition, graduated with a First Class Honours degree and went on to win the coveted Song Prize at the annual Kathleen Ferrier Awards.
Martin Sturfält	2004–2005, 2006–2007	Music - Pianist	Pianist who received support for two years to study at the Guildhall School of Music & Drama in London. Today, he is one of the most sought-after Swedish musicians of his generation, known especially for his recordings of the music of Wilhelm Stenhammar.

== Patrons ==
The Society's Patrons are HM King Charles III, King Carl XVI Gustaf, and the Swedish Ambassador to the Court of St. James's.

== Arms ==
Coat of arms of Anglo-Swedish Society
Crest Within a circlet of garbs each two-handled and banded saltirewise Or a demi Lion guardant Gules holding between the paws a mullet voided Or. Escutcheon Azure on a dess between three coronets Or as many lion's faces Gules. Motto Albion Et Polaris Badge A lion passant guardant holding aloft in the dexter forepaw a coronet Or.
