= Anna Malikova =

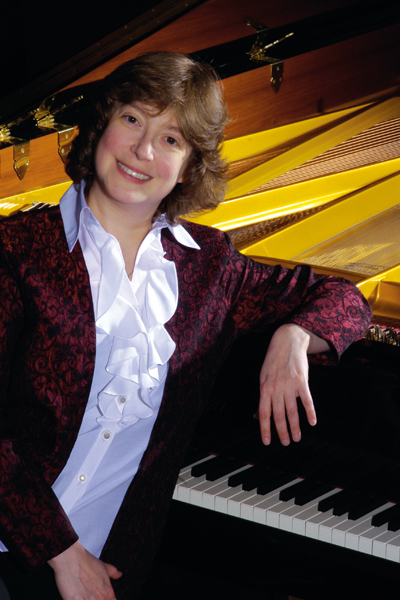
- Born: Anna Malikova; 14 July 1965 (age 60); Tashkent, Uzbek SSR, USSR
- Occupations: Classical pianist; Academic teacher
- Years active: 1993–present
- Organizations: Australian Chamber Orchestra; Bavarian Radio Orchestra; Oslo Philharmonic; Sydney Symphony Orchestra; Warsaw Philharmonic Orchestra; University of Music and Performing Arts Vienna
- Website: www.malikova.com

Anna Malikova (born 14 July 1965) is a Russian pianist and academic teacher in Vienna.

== Life ==
Malikova was born in Tashkent, Uzbek SSR, where she received her first musical education with Tamara A. Popovich at Uspensky Music School. At the age of 14 years she entered Central Music School in Moscow in the class of Lev Naumov. Later, she continued her studies with Naumov at Tchaikovsky Conservatory. After her graduation she taught at the conservatory as Naumov's assistant from 1992 until 1996. Her career started afterwards, first in the Soviet Union. She currently lives in Vienna, Austria.

=== Performances ===
Malikova played recitals in Moscow, Leningrad, Omsk, Baku and with orchestras in Ekaterinburg, Minsk, Nizhny Novgorod, Kazan and Tashkent. After winning the 1st Prize at ARD Competition Munich she began to perform worldwide. Today she plays in recitals and with orchestra, gives master classes and judges in competitions in Armenia, China, Europe, Japan, Korea, and South America. From 2002 until 2005 she was substitute professor at Folkwang University in Essen, Germany, and from 2011 until 2013 visiting professor at Szymanowski Academy in Katowice, Poland. In October 2018 Anna Malikova was appointed distinguished professor at the University of Music and Performing Arts Vienna.

== Awards and competitions ==
- 1988 Oslo, Crown Princess Sonja International Music Competition, 5th Prize
- 1990 Warsaw, XII International Chopin Piano Competition, 5th Prize
- 1992 Sydney, International Piano Competition of Australia, 5th Prize
- 1993 Munich, ARD International Music Competition, 1st Prize
- 2006 Classical Internet Awards, Camille Saint-Saëns, Piano Concertos III & V

== Recordings ==
Classical Records

- Frederic Chopin, Mazurkas, Ballads, Walzes, Andante Spianato
- Frederic Chopin, the two piano concertos; Orchestra Filarmonica di Torino, Julian Kovatchev
- Frederic Chopin, integral Préludes and Impromptus
- Frederic Chopin, integral Etudesop. 10, op. 25, op. posth.
- Franz Schubert, sonata A major D 664, sonata B flat major D 960
- Franz Schubert, Lieder-Arrangements by Franz Liszt
- Dmitri Schostakowitsch, Préludes op. 28, Phantastic Dances, Puppet Dances
- Padre Antonio Soler, 19 selected sonatas
- Sergei Prokofiev, Sarcasmen op. 17, Visions fugitives op. 22, Romeo & Julia op. 75
- Camille Saint-Saëns, complete piano concertos 1- 5, WDR Sinfonieorchester Köln, conducted by Thomas Sanderling. 2 SACD Audite 2010

Audite Musikproduktion

- Camille Saint-Saëns, integral piano concertos I – V (Doppel-CD); WDR Radio-Symphony Orchestra Cologne, con. Thomas Sanderling

Farao Classics

- Peter Tchaikowsky, Ballet Suites Sleeping Beauty and Nutcracker, Children's Album

ACOUSENCE

- Johannes Brahms, piano concerto no. 2; Duisburg Philharmonic, con. Jonathan Darlington
- Alexander Scriabin, integral piano sonatas I – X
- Robert Schumann & Dmitri Shostakovich, the piano quintets; with Belenus Quartet
- Tastentänze, works for 4 pianos with Nami Ejiri, Vladimir Soultanov, Dmitry Kalashnikov
