= Donald Hankey =

British soldier and writer (1884–1916)

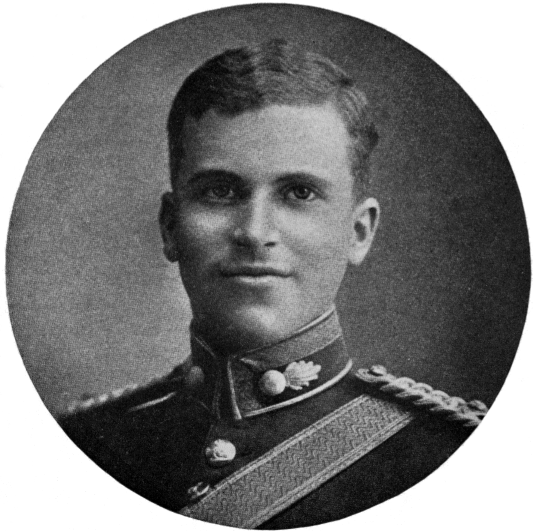
- Donald Hankey
- Born: 27 October 1884; Brighton, Sussex, England
- Died: 12 October 1916 (aged 31) near Le Transloy, France
- Military career
- Allegiance: United Kingdom
- Branch: British Army
- Conflicts: World War I

Donald William Alers Hankey (27 October 1884 – 12 October 1916) was an English soldier best known for two volumes of essays about the British volunteer army in World War I both titled A Student in Arms.

== Biography ==
Donald Hankey was born in Brighton, Sussex, the youngest child of Robert Alers Hankey and Helen Bakewell Hankey. The senior Hankey returned to England with his Australian wife after having made his fortune sheep farming in South Australia. Maurice Hankey was one of Donald's brothers. As his father and his three older brothers had done, Donald attended Rugby School and from there he entered the Royal Military Academy at Woolwich in the autumn of 1901 when he was not yet seventeen. After what he later remembered as "the two most miserable years of my life" at Woolwich Academy, Hankey received his commission as a second lieutenant, joined the Royal Garrison Artillery and was ultimately stationed in Mauritius until serious ill-health led to his return to England on extended sick leave at the end of 1906.

With his military career apparently cut short, three considerations entered into Hankey's view of his future. One was his long-standing interest in an eventual career as a Church of England clergyman; another was a recently formed fascination with the challenge of ministering in some way to the manifold needs of the urban poor; and finally, a comfortable legacy at his father's death (1906) gave him the means to make these two objectives practicable. Accordingly, he spent four months in residence at Rugby House, a mission in one of London's roughest pockets of poverty, and at the same time enrolled in a "crammer" at Charterhouse with the aim of gaining admittance to university and ultimately to ordination in the Church. Rugby Mission opened Hankey's eyes to what it might take to work effectively with young people in the slums, but he did succeed in entering Oxford.

Having resigned his army commission and having treated himself to a four-month holiday on the Continent, Hankey began his theological studies as a member of Corpus Christi College. His three years at Oxford were fruitful. His theological studies gave focus to his convictions, and he produced what was eventually published as The Cross, a short book on the Atonement. Still more crucial, however, was Hankey's introduction to life at the Oxford and Bermondsey Mission, established and maintained by Oxonians in what was then a notoriously squalid London neighbourhood south of the Thames. His connection with Bermondsey became one of the most decisive influences in Donald Hankey's life.

After Oxford (and after a return visit to Mauritius by way of Kenya and Madagascar), Hankey entered the clergy school in Leeds, but found it stultifying and soon gravitated back to Bermondsey where he plunged into the demanding work of the Oxford mission's several boys' clubs. But what Hankey had assumed would be his path to ordination in the Church of England continued to lead him in unexpected ways. For various reasons, as he accustomed himself to the life of an Oxford missionary among the noise and stench of Bermondsey, it came to seem all too congenial and curiously unchallenging. Accordingly, (dressed as a labourer, an identity he sometimes assumed in London's mean streets), Hankey sailed for Australia as a steerage passenger, seeking first of all hard manual work and also the chance eventually to establish a wholesome refuge for London's hopeless poor somewhere in the vast reaches of the sub-continent. Farm work, travel, and a series of articles on "Australian Life" for the Westminster Gazette occupied this interval.

Returning to the UK and to Bermondsey in the winter of 1913, Hankey resumed his work with the Mission, looking ahead to a more constructive sojourn in Australia the next summer and throwing himself into the writing of a book on Jesus and the failings of the contemporary church. That book, The Lord of All Good Life, was headed for publication and Hankey was preparing to travel back to Australia when war came in August 1914. He put in for a commission, but hearing that Lord Kitchener had called for one hundred thousand recruits under thirty, Hankey (who was some two months short of that limit) decided that as a "possible parson" he preferred "experience in the ranks", and on 8 August enlisted as a private in the 7th Battalion of the Rifle Brigade.

"Gentleman rankers" such as Hankey were not unknown in what became known as "Kitchener's Mob", but few of them had attended a military academy or previously held commissions. Because of his military experience, Hankey was made a sergeant within a week, then sent to barracks at Aldershot and later billeted with an elderly Mrs. Coppin of Firs Cottage in nearby Elstead. He spent several months there training recruits and, to some degree, acting as an intermediary between the men and the military authorities above them. He found this period deeply satisfying, more so than his earlier work among London's poor. It also marked the beginning of his recognition as a writer: The Lord of All Good Life, subtitled "A study of the greatness of Jesus and the weakness of His Church" and credited to "Donald Hankey, Sergeant, Rifle Brigade", was published in October of that year. Its modest but favourable reception may have been helped in part by the description of its author as a soldier in the ranks, and it gave Hankey confidence as a writer.

From Elstead his posting to dismal Bordon was a next step toward active combat. About this time the captain put in charge of Hankey's company turned out to be such an unpleasant contrast to the man Donald had been serving under that he gave up his sergeant's stripes in order to be transferred to another company. This incident was part of the inspiration for what became Hankey's most popularly admired essay, "The Beloved Captain", an uncharacteristically effusive tribute to the memory of Captain Ronald Hardy, who as a lieutenant had been Hankey's platoon commander.

Hankey's two tours of combat duty were separated by about a year and by a change in rank from corporal in the Rifle Brigade to second lieutenant in the Royal Warwickshire Regiment. The first culminated in his being wounded near Ypres on 30 July 1915. Since crossing the Channel in May, Hankey had begun to write about the war, more in the form of reflective essays than in personal narrative; but his injuries formed the basis for an impressionistic and somewhat disguised account of that particular experience, later published as The Honour of the Brigade. During his protracted convalescence, Hankey was prompted to apply for a commission. Various considerations were involved in this decision, especially the urging of his older brother Maurice, himself a former captain in the Royal Marine Artillery who was already well along in what would become a distinguished career as Secretary of the Committee of Imperial Defence and eventually Cabinet Secretary.

At length, and not without misgivings, Donald was commissioned, finally joining the "Warwicks" infantry regiment, and returned to action. In the meantime Hankey was becoming an acclaimed, though as yet anonymous, author of a series of essays appearing in The Spectator under the nom de plume "A Student in Arms".

Hankey's essays described the experiences of ordinary British soldiers during the First World War. They were collected in two volumes under the title A Student in Arms, which was published by Andrew Melrose in 1916 and in 1917. The second volume appearing posthumously.

It is not surprising that the later essays written by the "Student in Arms" during his second close-up view of war are significantly more sombre. Some, in fact, were rejected by the Spectator owing to their "change in tone". The battle-tested Hankey's sympathies for the increasingly younger officers and men become ever more acute; his confidence that their sacrifice will be sufficiently honoured grows less certain. His brief first-hand participation in the cataclysmic opening day of the Battle of the Somme and its sickening aftermath mark some of Hankey's final letters with unmistakable signs of shock. After a short respite at an Army School behind the lines, Hankey was back in the trenches near Le Transloy. On 6 October, he wrote in calm resignation to his sister Hilda that heavy fighting was just ahead. It is part of the Hankey legend that as he and his men waited to go "over the top" at 1:30 on the afternoon of 12 October 1916, Lt Hankey was heard to tell them, "If you are wounded, 'Blighty'; if killed, the Resurrection!" Hankey died in that attack and was buried near where he fell. That grave was never located, and his name appears on the huge Thiepval memorial to the 70,000 missing and unidentified dead who fought on the Somme.

== Works ==
- Australian Life (six articles in the Westminster Gazette, 26 July to 29 August 1913)
- The Lord of All Good Life (Longmans: 1914)
- Faith or Fear? An Appeal to the Church of England (D. Hankey et al.) (Macmillan: 1916)
- A Student in Arms (Andrew Melrose: 1916)
- A Student in Arms, Second Series (Andrew Melrose: 1917)
- The Cross (Andrew Melrose: 1919)
- Letters of "A Student in Arms" (Donald Hankey) (Andrew Melrose: 1921)
