= Maurice Hankey, 1st Baron Hankey =

British civil servant (1877–1963)

The Right Honourable The Lord Hankey GCB GCMG GCVO PC FRS
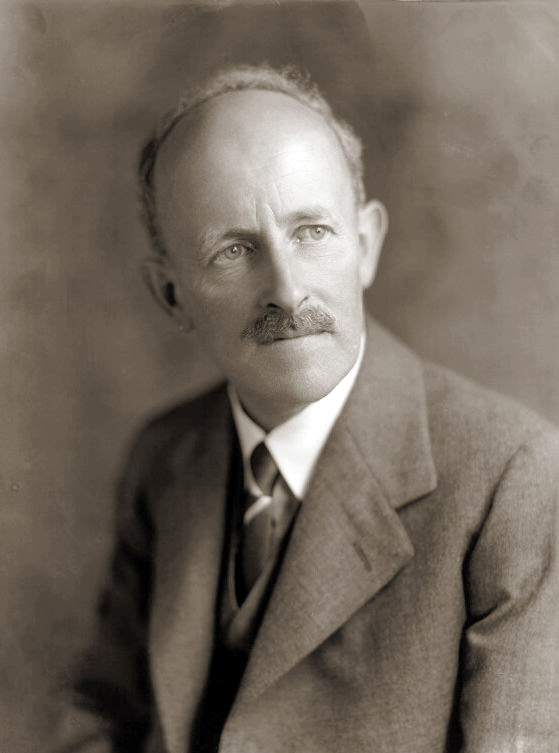
- Hankey in 1934

Cabinet Secretary
- In office 1916 – August 1938
- Prime Minister: David Lloyd George; Bonar Law; Stanley Baldwin; Ramsay MacDonald; Neville Chamberlain
- Preceded by: Inaugural holder
- Succeeded by: Sir Edward Bridges

Chancellor of the Duchy of Lancaster
- In office 14 May 1940 – 20 July 1941
- Prime Minister: Winston Churchill
- Preceded by: The Lord Tryon
- Succeeded by: Duff Cooper

Personal details
- Born: 1 April 1877 Biarritz, France
- Died: 26 January 1963 (aged 85) Redhill, Surrey, England

Maurice Pascal Alers Hankey, 1st Baron Hankey, GCB, GCMG, GCVO, PC, FRS (1 April 1877 – 26 January 1963) was a British civil servant who gained prominence as the first Cabinet Secretary and later made the rare transition from the civil service to ministerial office. He is best known as the highly-efficient top aide to Prime Minister David Lloyd George and the War Cabinet, which directed Britain during the First World War.

In the estimation of his biographer John F. Naylor, Hankey held to the "certainties of a late Victorian imperialist, whose policies sought to maintain British domination abroad and to avoid as far as possible British entanglement within Europe. His patriotism stands inviolable, but his sensitivity to processes of historical change proved limited". Naylor found, "Hankey did not altogether grasp the virulence of fascism ... except as a military threat to Britain; nor did he ever quite comprehend the changing face of domestic politics which Labour's emergence as a party of government entailed. ... In these shortcomings Hankey was typical of his generation and background; that his responsibility was greater lay in the fact that he was better informed than nearly any of his contemporaries".

== Early life ==
The third son of R. A. Hankey, Maurice Hankey was born at Biarritz in 1877 and educated at Rugby School. He joined the Royal Marine Artillery, was promoted to captain and served in successive roles, including as coastal defence analyst in the War Division of the Naval Intelligence Department (1902–1906). His youngest brother, Donald Hankey, was a soldier best known for a series of essays that he wrote while he served on the Western Front in World War I. Donald died in action at Battle of the Somme.

== Career in government ==
In 1908, Hankey was appointed Naval Assistant Secretary to the Committee of Imperial Defence. He became Secretary to the Committee in 1912, a position that he would hold for 26 years. In November 1914, he took on the additional duty of Secretary of the War Council. In that function, he took notice of the ideas of Major Ernest Swinton to build a tracked armoured vehicle and brought them to the attention of Winston Churchill on 25 December 1914. This led to the eventual creation of the Landship Committee.

In December 1916, David Lloyd George became Prime Minister and greatly changed how the government was run. A small War Cabinet was instigated, and Hankey was appointed as its Secretary and served as Secretary of the Imperial War Cabinet, which also incorporated representatives of the Colonies and Dominion governments. He gained such a reputation for strong competence that when the full Cabinet was restored in 1919, the secretariat was retained, and Hankey then served as Secretary to the Cabinet for 19 years.

In 1923, he acquired the further position of Clerk of the Privy Council. During his long tenure (1923-1938), he would also often serve as British Secretary to many international conferences and Secretary-General of many Imperial Conferences. John Cairncross, one of the Cambridge Spies, briefly served as his secretary.

In August 1938, Hankey retired from government and became a British Government Director of the Suez Canal Company, a post that he would hold for only one year. Hankey remained a respected figure and was often consulted by ministers and civil servants for advice. In August 1939, he advised Neville Chamberlain about the formation of a new War Cabinet and, the following month, became another of Chamberlain's many non-party political appointments when he was made Minister without Portfolio and a member of the War Cabinet. Hankey was reluctant to take on the task but agreed to do so. He became Chancellor of the Duchy of Lancaster when Chamberlain was succeeded by Winston Churchill in May 1940 but was left out of Churchill's War Cabinet.

In July 1941, Lord Hankey was moved to the position of Paymaster General, but the following year, he was dropped from the government altogether. He continued to hold other positions in both the public and private sectors until his death.

== Post-war writings ==
After World War II, Hankey emerged as a leading critic of the war crimes trials, and in his 1950 book Politics, Trials and Errors, he argued that the Allies had no right to convict German and Japanese leaders of war crimes. Hankey kept handwritten diaries throughout most of his years as a civil servant, including during his time as Secretary to the War Council and Imperial War Cabinet of the First World War. The diaries are held at the Churchill Archives Centre in Cambridge, England, and can be read by the public.

== Personal life and death ==
Around Christmas 1902, Hankey met Adeline de Smidt. They married in September 1903. The couple had a strong and supportive relationship, with Adeline frequently accompanying him to social engagements with prominent figures, and to significant events such as the Paris Peace Conference and the Genoa Conference. They had four children: Robert (born 1905), Ursula (born 1909), Christopher (born 1911) and Henry (born 1914). A fifth child was stillborn in 1916. The Hankey family moved several times while their children were young, living in Malta for a year in 1907 before eventually settling in Highstead, near Limpsfield, Surrey.

Lord Hankey died in 1963, aged 85, and was succeeded in his barony by his eldest son, Robert.

== Honours ==
In the 1912 Birthday Honours, Hankey was appointed to the Order of the Bath as a Companion. He was then promoted within the same order as a Knight Commander in 1916 and as a Knight Grand Cross in 1919. In the 1929 Birthday Honours, Sir Maurice was appointed to the Order of St Michael and St George as a Knight Grand Cross. In the 1934 New Year Honours, Sir Maurice was appointed to the Royal Victorian Order as a Knight Grand Cross.

In the 1939 New Year Honours, he was raised to the peerage as Baron Hankey, of The Chart in the County of Surrey. The same year, he was also appointed to the Privy Council. In 1942, he was elected to the Royal Society as a Fellow under Statute 12 for those "who have rendered conspicuous service to the cause of science, or are such that election would be of signal benefit to the Society".

Coat of arms of Maurice Hankey, 1st Baron Hankey
Crest A wolf's head erased at the neck Erminois, gorged with a collar wavy Azure. Escutcheon Per pale Azure and Gules, a wolf salient Erminois vulned on the shoulder of the second, a bordure wavey of the third. Supporters Dexter: A fallow deer resting the sinister hind foot Proper on a millrind Sable; Sinister: An alpine chamois resting the dexter hind foot Proper on a like millrind. Motto Per Sagitatem Pax Cum Justitia

== Sources ==
- Hankey, Maurice (1961). The Supreme Command. Vol. I (1914–1918). George Allen & Unwin. OCLC 249296.
- Hankey, Maurice (1961). The Supreme Command. Vol. II (1914–1918). George Allen & Unwin. OCLC 249296.
- Hankey, Maurice (1963). The Supreme Control: At the Paris Peace Conference 1919. George Allen & Unwin.
- Roskill, Stephen (1970). Hankey: Man of Secrets. Vol. I (1877–1918). Collins. ISBN 0-00-211327-9.
- Roskill, Stephen (1972). Hankey: Man of Secrets. Vol. II (1919–1931). Collins. ISBN 0-00-211330-9.
- Roskill, Stephen (1974). Hankey: Man of Secrets. Vol. III (1931–1963). Collins. ISBN 0-00-211332-5.
- Naylor, John F. (1984). A Man & an Institution: Sir Maurice Hankey, the Cabinet Secretariat, and the custody of Cabinet secrecy. Cambridge: Cambridge University Press. ISBN 0-521-25583-X.

Government offices
Preceded by Charles Ottley	Secretary to the Committee of Imperial Defence; 1912–1938	Succeeded by H L Ismay
New office	Cabinet Secretary; 1916–1938	Succeeded by Sir Edward Bridges
Preceded by Sir Almeric Fitzroy	Clerk of the Privy Council; 1923–1938	Succeeded by Sir Rupert Howorth
Political offices
Preceded by The Lord Tryon	Chancellor of the Duchy of Lancaster; 1940–1941	Succeeded by Duff Cooper
Vacant Title last held by Viscount Cranborne	Paymaster General; 1941–1942	Succeeded by Sir William Jowitt
Peerage of the United Kingdom
New creation	Baron Hankey; 1939–1963	Succeeded by Robert Hankey
