= Martin Sturfält =

- Born: 1979 (age 46–47); Katrineholm, Sweden
- Genre: Classical Piano
- Instrument: Piano
- Label: Hyperion Records
- Website: https://www.martinsturfalt.com/

Martin Sturfält (born 1979 in Katrineholm) is a Swedish classical pianist.

== Biography ==
Martin studied at the Stockholm Royal College of Music and at the Guildhall School of Music & Drama in London.

Martin began giving regular concerts at the age of 11, and has since performed throughout Scandinavia, UK and the rest of Europe, as well as in Asia and the USA.

Martin has appeared with the Hallé Orchestra, the Gothenborg Symphonic Orchestra, the Royal Stockholm Philharmonic and the Swedish Radio Symphony.

== Discography ==
2008: Stenhammar: Piano Music

2012: Wiklund: Piano Concertos

2013: Mendelssohn: complete works for cello and piano (with Marie Macleod)

== Reviews ==
- Opus (4/2012) Wiklund ska man ha
