= Carlsbad Programme =

Political demands by Sudeten German Party in 1938

- Presented: 24 April 1938
- Location: Karlovy Vary (Carlsbad)
- Author: Konrad Henlein
- Media type: Speech
- Purpose: Demand for autonomy of the mainly German-inhabited border regions of Czechoslovakia known as the Sudetenland

The Carlsbad Programme (Czech: Karlovarský program, Slovak: Karlovarský program, German: Karlsbader Programm) was an eight-point series of demands, addressed to the government of Czechoslovakia, issued by Konrad Henlein, the leader of the Sudeten German Party (SdP), at a party gathering in Karlovy Vary (Carlsbad) on 24 April 1938.The programme demanded full autonomy for the mainly German-inhabited areas of Czechoslovakia, known as the Sudetenland. Under pressure from its allies, Britain and France, the Czechoslovak government reluctantly accepted the demands. But the SdP, instructed by Nazi Germany not to reach a settlement with the Czechoslovak authorities, broke off negotiations, thus precipitating the Munich crisis.

== Background ==
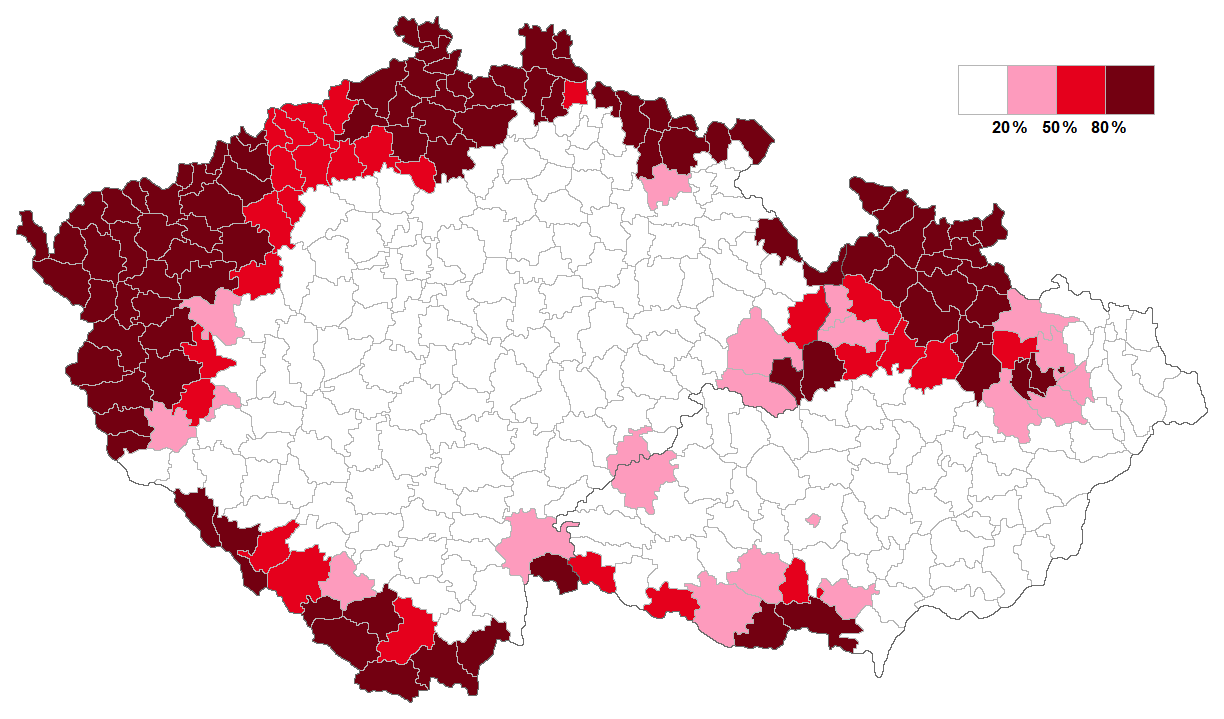
Districts in Czechoslovakia with an ethnic German population of 20% or more (pink), 50% or more (red), and 80 % or more (dark red) according to the census of 1930.

Following the end of the First World War and the collapse of Austria-Hungary, the Czechoslovak Republic emerged on the territory of the modern-day Czech Republic, Slovakia and part of Ukraine. For a combination of economic and strategic reasons, the western border of the newly formed state maintained the historic boundary with Germany and included the predominantly German-speaking Sudetenland. As a result, Czechoslovakia contained a substantial German minority population of over 3 million. Czechs and Slovaks together numbered fewer than 9 million.

The Sudeten Germans did not want to belong to a Czechoslovak state after the First World War, because they were used to being part of the Habsburg monarchy and they did not suddenly want to be a minority in a state of Czechs and Slovaks. The new constitution was worked out without them and they were not consulted about whether they wished to be citizens of Czechoslovakia. Although the constitution of Czechoslovakia guaranteed equality for all citizens, there was a tendency among political leaders to transform the country "into an instrument of Czech and Slovak nationalism" and the Sudeten Germans believed they were not granted enough rights as a minority group. Some progress was made to integrate the Germans and other minorities, but they continued to be under-represented in the government and the army.

During the Great Depression the highly industrialized and export-oriented regions populated by the German minority, together with other peripheral regions of Czechoslovakia, were hurt by the economic depression more than the interior of the country which was mainly inhabited by Czech and Slovak populations. By 1936, 60 percent of the unemployed people in Czechoslovakia were Germans. The Sudeten Germans were represented by parties from across the political spectrum. German nationalist sentiment was strong in the Sudetenland from the early years of the republic and there was strong calls for autonomy and even union with Germany and Austria. The high unemployment, as well as the imposition of Czech in schools and all public spaces, made people more open to populist and extremist movements such as fascism, communism, and German irredentism. In these years, the parties of German nationalists and later the Sudeten German Party (SdP) with its radical demands gained immense popularity among Germans in Czechoslovakia.

The Sudeten German Party (SdP) was formed in 1933 by Konrad Henlein with the merger of the German National Socialist Workers' Party (Czechoslovakia) and the German National Party after these parties were outlawed. The party represented many of the German nationalist positions, which approximated to those of Nazi Germany. Historians differ as to whether the SdP was from its beginning a Nazi front organization, or evolved into one. The Sudeten German Party was "militant, populist, and openly hostile" to the Czechoslovak government and soon captured two-thirds of the vote in districts with a heavy German population. By 1935, the SdP was the second largest political party in Czechoslovakia as German votes concentrated on this party while Czech and Slovak votes were spread among several parties.

== Declaration of demands ==
Following the annexation of Austria in March 1938, Hitler's attention turned to Czechoslovakia. At a meeting with Henlein in Berlin on 28 March 1938, Hitler instructed the leader of the SdP to make unacceptable demands of the Czechoslovak government for political reforms. The aim was to maintain tension but to avoid reaching a resolution of the issues until Hitler was ready to intervene directly.

On 24 April 1938, speaking at a meeting of the SdP held in Carlsbad, Henlein issued a series of demands addressed to the Czechoslovak government. The list of demands - known as the Carlsbad Programme - consisted of the following eight points:

=== Carlsbad Programme ===
1. Establishment of full equality of status between Czech and Germans.
2. Recognition of the Sudeten Germans as a legal personality in order to maintain their equal status within the state.
3. Definition and recognition of the German settlement area within the state.
4. Establishment of full self-government for the German settlement area in all aspects of public life concerning the German population.
5. Creation of legal protection for citizens living outside the settlement area of their nationality.
6. Elimination of injustices inflicted upon the Sudeten Germans since 1918 and compensation for the damage caused to them.
7. Recognition and realisation of the principle: Only German public officials within the German settlement area.
8. Full freedom to profess German nationality and the German world view.

== Aftermath ==
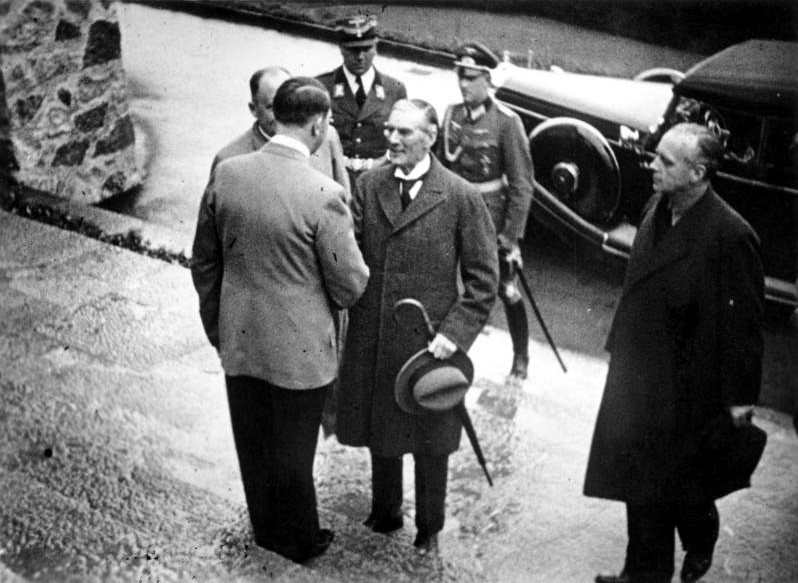
Adolf Hitler greets British Prime Minister Neville Chamberlain on the steps of the Berghof, 15 September 1938

The Czechoslovak government rejected Henlein's demands believing that the full implementation of the Carlsbad Programme would result in the unacceptable creation of a Nazi-style political system within part of the territory of a democratic state. But the government expressed a willingness to address some of the issues raised.

As the previous appeasement of Hitler had shown, the governments of both France and Britain were intent on avoiding war. The French government did not wish to face Germany alone and took its lead from Britain's Conservative government of Prime Minister Neville Chamberlain. Chamberlain considered the Sudeten German grievances justified and believed Hitler's intentions were limited. Both Britain and France, therefore, advised Czechoslovakia to accede to Germany's demands. Beneš resisted and on 19 May initiated a partial mobilization in response to possible German invasion. On 20 May, Hitler presented his generals with a draft plan of attack on Czechoslovakia codenamed Operation Green. Ten days later, Hitler signed a secret directive for war against Czechoslovakia, to begin not later than the 1 October. In the meantime, the British government demanded that Beneš request a mediator. Not wishing to sever his government's ties with Western Europe, Beneš reluctantly accepted. The British appointed Lord Runciman and instructed him to persuade Beneš to agree to a plan acceptable to the Sudeten Germans.

During August, the German press was full of stories alleging Czechoslovak atrocities against the Sudeten Germans, with the intention of forcing the Western Powers into putting pressure on the Czechoslovaks to make concessions. Hitler hoped the Czechoslovaks would refuse and that the Western Powers would then feel morally justified in leaving the Czechoslovaks to their fate. In August, Germany sent 750,000 soldiers along the border of Czechoslovakia officially as part of army maneuvers. On 4 or 5 September Beneš submitted the Fourth Plan, granting nearly all the demands of the Munich Agreement. The Sudeten Germans were not intent on conciliation and were under instructions from Hitler to avoid a compromise, and after the SdP held demonstrations that provoked police action in Ostrava on 7 September in which two of their parliamentary deputies were arrested, the Sudeten Germans used this incident and false allegations of other atrocities as an excuse to break off further negotiations.

On 12 September Hitler made a speech at a Nazi Party rally in Nuremberg on the Sudeten crisis in which he condemned the actions of the government of Czechoslovakia. Hitler denounced Czechoslovakia as being a fraudulent state that was in violation of international law's emphasis of national self-determination and accused President Beneš of seeking to gradually exterminate the Sudeten Germans. Hitler stated that he would support the right of the self-determination of fellow Germans in the Sudetenland.

On 13 September, after internal violence and disruption in Czechoslovakia ensued, Chamberlain asked Hitler for a personal meeting to find a solution to avert a war. The two met at Hitler's residence in Berchtesgaden on 15 September and agreed to the cession of the Sudetenland; three days later, French Prime Minister Édouard Daladier did the same. No Czechoslovak representative was invited to these discussions. On the same day, Hitler met with Chamberlain and demanded the swift takeover of the Sudetenland by the Third Reich under threat of war. The Czechs, Hitler claimed, were slaughtering the Sudeten Germans. Chamberlain referred the demand to the British and French governments; both accepted. The Czechoslovak government resisted, arguing that Hitler's proposal would ruin the nation's economy and ultimately lead to German control of all of Czechoslovakia. The United Kingdom and France issued an ultimatum and on 21 September, Czechoslovakia capitulated.

With no end in sight to the dispute, Chamberlain appealed to Hitler for a conference. On 28 September, Hitler met with the chiefs of governments of France, Italy and Britain in Munich. The Czechoslovak government was neither invited nor consulted. On 29 September, the Munich Agreement was signed by Germany, Italy, France, and Britain. The Czechoslovak government capitulated on 30 September and agreed to abide by the agreement. The Munich Agreement stipulated that Czechoslovakia must cede Sudeten territory to Germany. German occupation of the Sudetenland would be completed by 10 October.

== See also ==
- Munich Agreement
- Occupation of Czechoslovakia (1938–1945)
- Sudetenland
- Areas annexed by Nazi Germany
- Germans in Czechoslovakia (1918–1938)
- Runciman Mission

== Bibliography ==
- Wiskemann, Elizabeth, Czechs and Germans: A Study of the Struggle in the Historic Provinces of Bohemia and Moravia, 2nd edn., London, 1967.
- Bruegel, J.W., Czechoslovakia Before Munich: The German Minority Problem and British Appeasement Policy, Cambridge, 1973.
- Smelser, R.M., The Sudeten Problem, 1933-1938: Volkstumspolitik and the Formulation of Nazi Foreign Policy, Folkestone, 1975.
- Behnen, Michael; Taddey, Gerhard (1998). Encyclopedia of German History. Events, institutions, persons. From the beginning to the capitulation 1945. Vol. 3. Stuttgart: Kröner. ISBN 3-520-81303-3.
