= Winston Churchill =

British statesman and writer (1874–1965)

The Right Honourable Sir Winston Churchill KG OM CH TD DL FRS RA
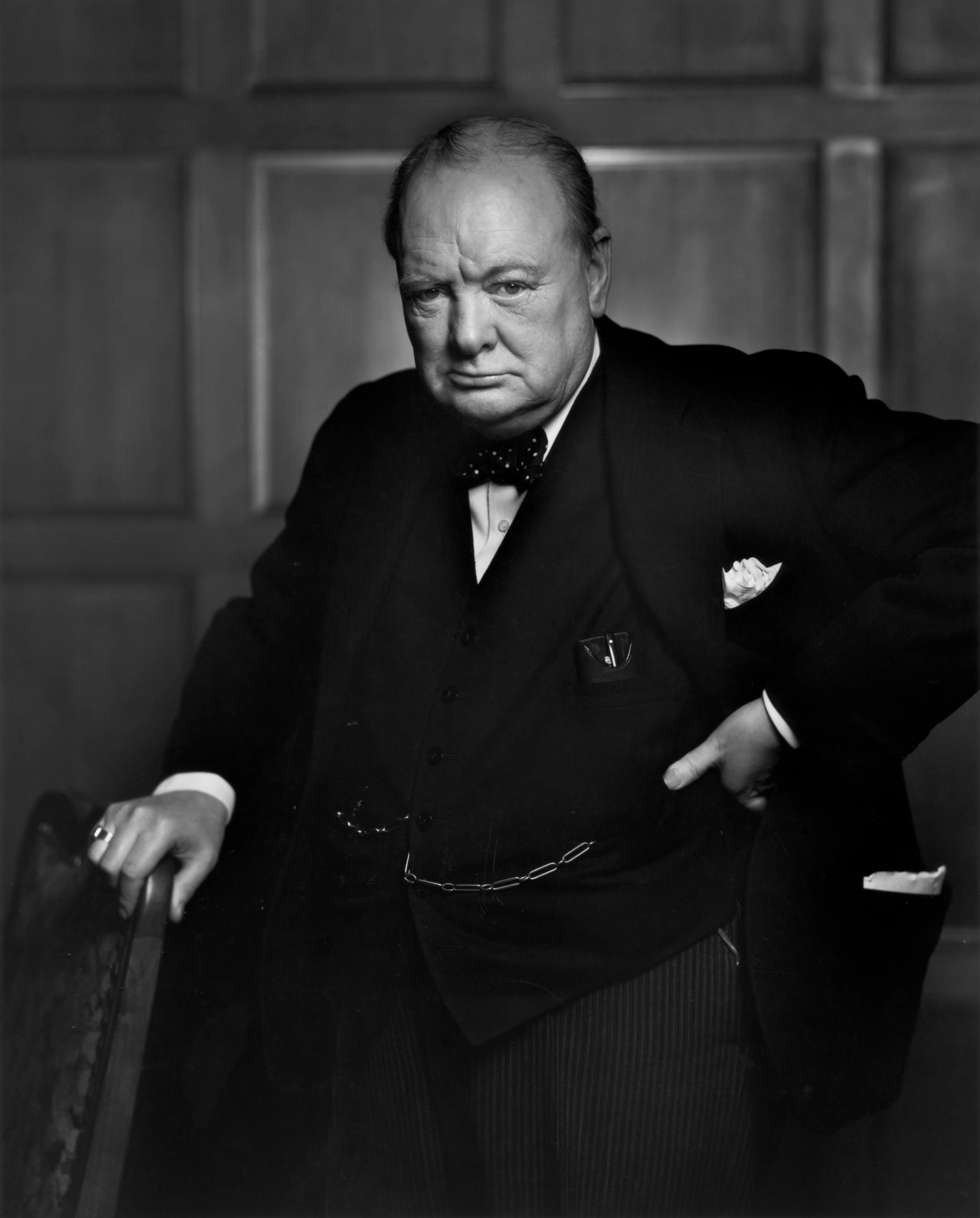
- The Roaring Lion, 1941

Prime Minister of the United Kingdom
- In office 26 October 1951 – 5 April 1955
- Monarchs: George VI; Elizabeth II
- Deputy: Anthony Eden
- Preceded by: Clement Attlee
- Succeeded by: Anthony Eden
- In office 10 May 1940 – 26 July 1945
- Monarch: George VI
- Deputy: Clement Attlee (de facto; 1942–1945)
- Preceded by: Neville Chamberlain
- Succeeded by: Clement Attlee
Senior political offices
Father of the House of Commons
In office 8 October 1959 – 25 September 1964
| Preceded by | David Grenfell |
| Succeeded by | Rab Butler |
Leader of the Opposition
In office 26 July 1945 – 26 October 1951
| Prime Minister | Clement Attlee |
| Preceded by | Clement Attlee |
| Succeeded by | Clement Attlee |
Leader of the Conservative Party
In office 9 October 1940 – 6 April 1955
| Preceded by | Neville Chamberlain |
| Succeeded by | Anthony Eden |
Ministerial offices 1939‍–‍1952
Minister of Defence
In office 28 October 1951 – 1 March 1952
| Prime Minister | Himself |
| Preceded by | Manny Shinwell |
| Succeeded by | Harold Alexander |
In office 10 May 1940 – 26 July 1945
| Prime Minister | Himself |
| Preceded by | Ernle Chatfield (Coordination of Defence) |
| Succeeded by | Clement Attlee |
First Lord of the Admiralty
In office 3 September 1939 – 11 May 1940
| Prime Minister | Neville Chamberlain |
| Preceded by | James Stanhope |
| Succeeded by | A. V. Alexander |
Ministerial offices 1908‍–‍1929
Chancellor of the Exchequer
In office 6 November 1924 – 4 June 1929
| Prime Minister | Stanley Baldwin |
| Preceded by | Philip Snowden |
| Succeeded by | Philip Snowden |
Secretary of State for the Colonies
In office 13 February 1921 – 19 October 1922
| Prime Minister | David Lloyd George |
| Preceded by | Alfred Milner |
| Succeeded by | Victor Cavendish |
Secretary of State for Air
In office 10 January 1919 – 13 February 1921
| Prime Minister | David Lloyd George |
| Preceded by | William Weir |
| Succeeded by | Frederick Guest |
Secretary of State for War
In office 10 January 1919 – 13 February 1921
| Prime Minister | David Lloyd George |
| Preceded by | The Viscount Milner |
| Succeeded by | Laming Worthington-Evans |
Minister of Munitions
In office 17 July 1917 – 10 January 1919
| Prime Minister | David Lloyd George |
| Preceded by | Christopher Addison |
| Succeeded by | Andrew Weir |
Chancellor of the Duchy of Lancaster
In office 25 May – 25 November 1915
| Prime Minister | H. H. Asquith |
| Preceded by | Edwin Montagu |
| Succeeded by | Herbert Samuel |
First Lord of the Admiralty
In office 24 October 1911 – 25 May 1915
| Prime Minister | H. H. Asquith |
| Preceded by | Reginald McKenna |
| Succeeded by | Arthur Balfour |
Home Secretary
In office 19 February 1910 – 24 October 1911
| Prime Minister | H. H. Asquith |
| Preceded by | Herbert Gladstone |
| Succeeded by | Reginald McKenna |
President of the Board of Trade
In office 12 April 1908 – 14 February 1910
| Prime Minister | H. H. Asquith |
| Preceded by | David Lloyd George |
| Succeeded by | Sydney Buxton |
Parliamentary offices
Member of Parliament
In office 29 October 1924 – 25 September 1964
| Preceded by | Leonard Lyle |
| Succeeded by | Constituency abolished |
| Constituency | Epping (1924–1945); Woodford (1945–1964) |
In office 24 October 1900 – 26 October 1922 Serving with Alexander Wilkie (1908–1922)
| Preceded by | Walter Runciman |
| Succeeded by | Edwin Scrymgeour; E. D. Morel |
| Constituency | Oldham (1900–1906); Manchester North West (1906–1908); Dundee (1908–1922) |

Personal details
- Born: 30 November 1874 Blenheim, Oxfordshire, England
- Died: 24 January 1965 (aged 90) Hyde Park Gate, London, England
- Resting place: St Martin's Church, Bladon, Oxfordshire
- Party: Conservative (1899–1904, 1924–1964)
- Other political affiliations: Liberal (1904–1924); Constitutionalist (1924)
- Spouse: Clementine Hozier (m. 1908)
- Children: 5, including Diana, Randolph, Sarah and Mary
- Parents: Lord Randolph Churchill; Jeanette "Jennie" Jerome
- Relatives: Spencer family
- Education: Royal Military College, Sandhurst
- Occupation: Historian; painter; politician; military officer; writer
- Civilian awards: Full list
Military positions
Military service
| Allegiance | British Empire |
| Branch/service | British Army; Territorial Army (from 1902) |
| Years of service | 1893–1924 |
| Rank | Colonel (Full list) |
| Unit | 4th Queen's Own Hussars; Malakand Field Force; 21st Lancers; South African Light Horse; Queen's Own Oxfordshire Hussars; Grenadier Guards; Royal Scots Fusiliers |
| Commands | 6th bn, Royal Scots Fusiliers |
| Battles/wars | North-West Frontier; Mahdist War; Second Boer War (POW); First World War |
| Military awards | Full list |
- Churchill's voice Be ye men of valour Recorded 19 May 1940

Sir Winston Leonard Spencer Churchill (Note: The surname is the double-barrelled Spencer Churchill (unhyphenated), but he is known by the surname Churchill. His father dropped the Spencer.) (30 November 1874 – 24 January 1965) was a British statesman, military officer, and writer who was Prime Minister of the United Kingdom from 1940 to 1945, during the Second World War, and again from 1951 to 1955. For some 62 of the years between 1900 and 1964, he was a member of Parliament (MP) and represented a total of five constituencies over that time. Ideologically an adherent to economic liberalism and imperialism, he was for most of his career a member of the Conservative Party, which he led from 1940 to 1955. He was a member of the Liberal Party from 1904 to 1924.

Of mixed English and American parentage, Churchill was born in Oxfordshire into the wealthy, aristocratic Spencer family. He joined the British Army in 1895 and saw action in British India, the Mahdist War and the Second Boer War, gaining fame as a war correspondent and writing books about his campaigns. Elected a Conservative MP in 1900, he defected to the Liberals in 1904. In H. H. Asquith's Liberal government, Churchill was president of the Board of Trade and later Home Secretary, championing prison reform and workers' social security. As First Lord of the Admiralty before and during the First World War he oversaw the disastrous naval attack on the Dardanelles (a prelude to the Gallipoli campaign) and was demoted to Chancellor of the Duchy of Lancaster. He resigned in November 1915 and joined the Royal Scots Fusiliers on the Western Front for six months. In 1917, he returned to government under David Lloyd George and served successively as Minister of Munitions, Secretary of State for War, Secretary of State for Air, and Secretary of State for the Colonies, overseeing the Anglo-Irish Treaty and British foreign policy in the Middle East. After two years out of Parliament, he was Chancellor of the Exchequer in Stanley Baldwin's Conservative government, returning sterling in 1925 to the gold standard, depressing the UK economy.

Out of government during his so-called "wilderness years" in the 1930s, Churchill took the lead in calling for rearmament to counter the threat of militarism in Nazi Germany. At the outbreak of the Second World War he was re-appointed First Lord of the Admiralty. In May 1940, he became prime minister, succeeding Neville Chamberlain. Churchill formed a national government and oversaw British involvement in the Allied war effort against the Axis powers, resulting in victory in 1945. After the Conservatives' defeat in the 1945 general election, he became Leader of the Opposition. Amid the developing Cold War with the Soviet Union, he publicly warned of an "iron curtain" of Soviet influence in Europe and promoted European unity. Between his terms, he wrote several books recounting his experience during the war. He was awarded the Nobel Prize in Literature in 1953. He lost the 1950 election but was returned to office in 1951. His second term was preoccupied with foreign affairs, especially Anglo-American relations and preservation of what remained of the British Empire, with India no longer a part of it. Domestically, his government's priority was their extensive and successful housebuilding programme. In declining health, Churchill resigned in 1955, remaining an MP until 1964. Upon his death in 1965, he was given a state funeral.

One of the 20th century's most significant figures, Churchill remains popular in the UK. He is generally viewed as a victorious wartime leader who played an integral role in defending liberal democracy against the spread of fascism. A staunch imperialist, he has sometimes been criticised for comments on race, in addition to some wartime decisions such as area bombing. Historians rank Churchill as one of the greatest British prime ministers.

== Early life ==
=== Childhood and schooling: 1874–1895 ===
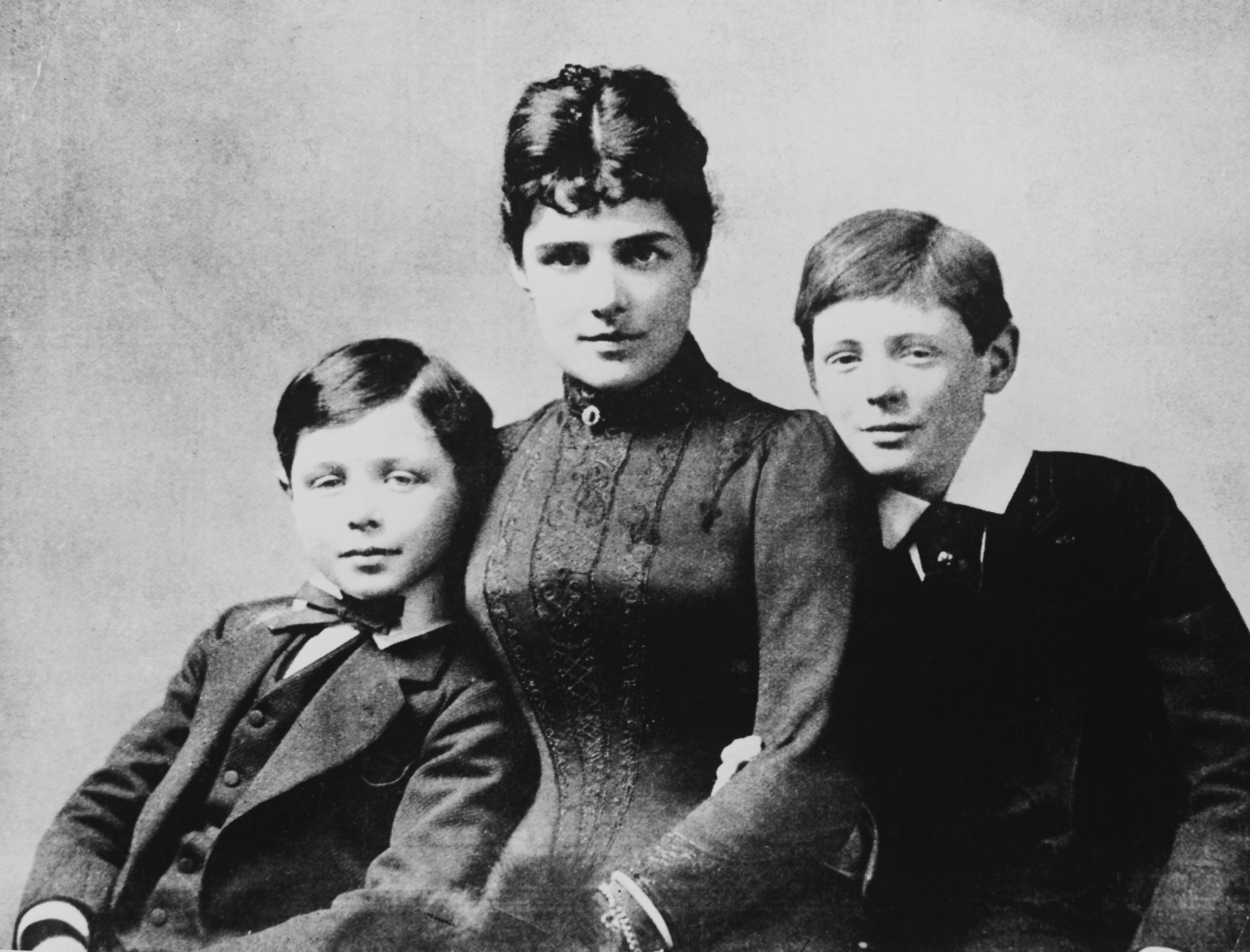
Jennie Spencer Churchill with her two sons, Jack (left) and Winston (right) in 1889

Winston Leonard Spencer Churchill was born on 30 November 1874 at his family's ancestral home, Blenheim Palace in Oxfordshire. On his father's side, he was a member of the aristocracy as a descendant of John Churchill, 1st Duke of Marlborough. His father, Lord Randolph Churchill, representing the Conservative Party, had been elected member of parliament (MP) for Woodstock in February 1874. His mother was Jennie, Lady Randolph Churchill, a daughter of Leonard Jerome, an American businessman.

In 1876, Churchill's paternal grandfather, John Spencer-Churchill, 7th Duke of Marlborough, was appointed Viceroy of Ireland. Randolph became his private secretary and the family relocated to Dublin. Winston's brother, Jack, was born there in 1880. For much of the 1880s, Randolph and Jennie were effectively estranged, and the brothers were cared for by their nanny, Elizabeth Everest. When she died in 1895, Churchill wrote "she had been my dearest and most intimate friend during the whole of the twenty years I had lived".

Churchill began boarding school at St George's in Ascot, Berkshire, aged 7, but he was not academic and his behaviour was poor. In 1884, he transferred to Brunswick School in Hove, where his academic performance improved. In April 1888, aged 13, he passed the entrance exam for Harrow School. His father wanted him to prepare for a military career, so his last three years at Harrow were in the army form. After two unsuccessful attempts to gain admittance to the Royal Military College, Sandhurst, he succeeded. He was accepted as a cadet in the cavalry, starting in September 1893. His father died in January 1895.

=== Cuba, India, and Sudan: 1895–1899 ===
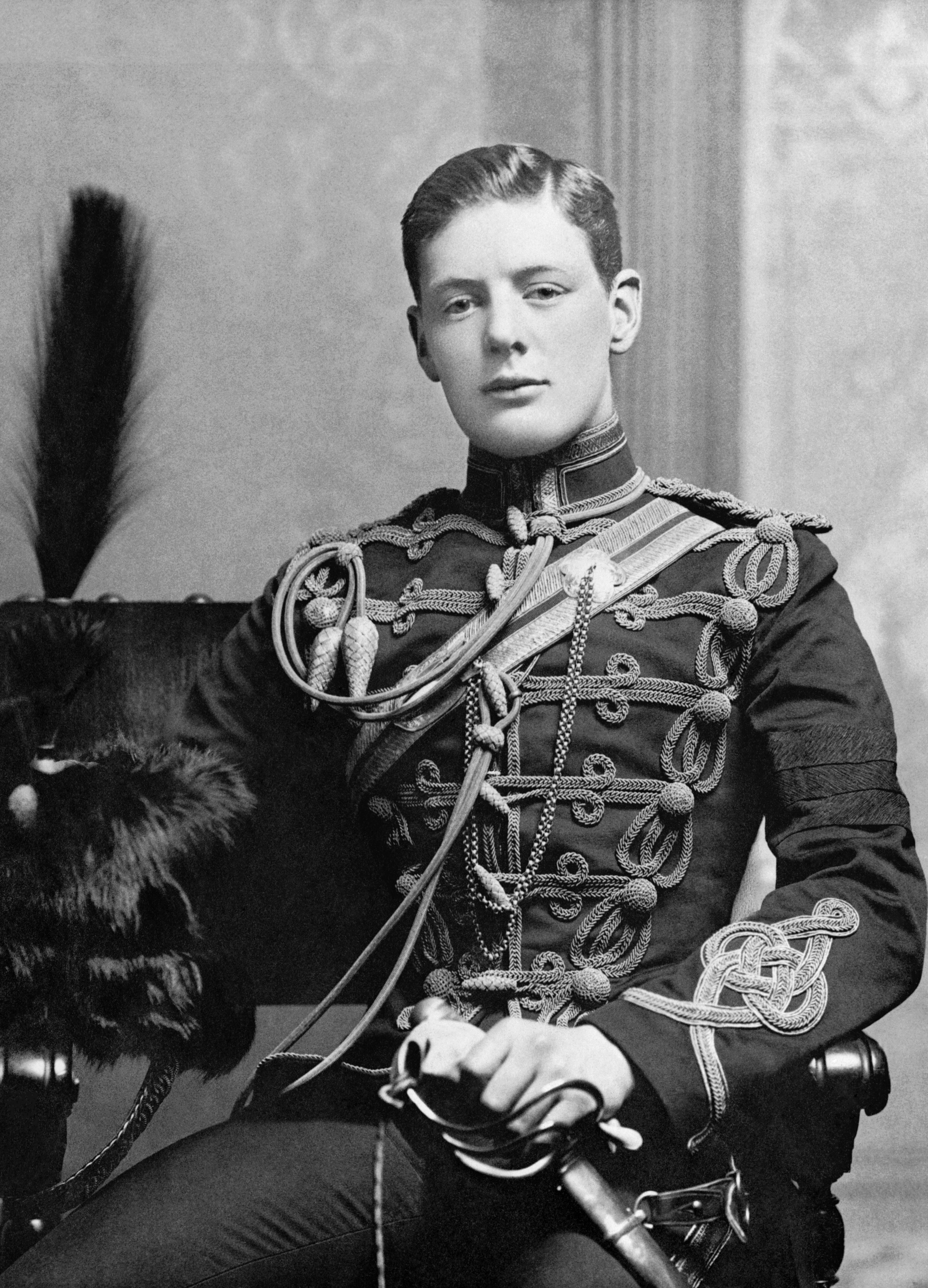
Churchill in the military dress uniform of the 4th Queen's Own Hussars at Aldershot in 1895

In February 1895, Churchill was commissioned as a second lieutenant in the 4th Queen's Own Hussars regiment of the British Army, based at Aldershot. Eager to witness military action, he used his mother's influence to get posted to a war zone. In the autumn, he and friend Reggie Barnes went to observe the Cuban War of Independence and became involved in skirmishes after joining Spanish troops attempting to suppress independence fighters. Churchill sent reports to the Daily Graphic in London. He proceeded to New York and wrote to his mother about "what an extraordinary people the Americans are!" With the Hussars, he went to Bombay in October 1896. Based in Bangalore, he was in India for 19 months, visiting Calcutta and joining expeditions to Hyderabad and the North West Frontier.

In India, Churchill began a self-education project, reading widely including Plato, Edward Gibbon, Charles Darwin and Thomas Babington Macaulay. The books were sent by his mother, with whom he shared frequent correspondence. To learn about politics, he asked her to send him copies of The Annual Register, the political almanack. In an 1898 letter, he referred to his beliefs, saying: "I do not accept the Christian or any other form of religious belief". Churchill had been christened in the Church of England but underwent a virulently anti-Christian phase in his youth, and as an adult was an agnostic. In another letter to a cousin, he referred to religion as "a delicious narcotic" and expressed a preference for Protestantism over Catholicism because he felt it "a step nearer Reason".

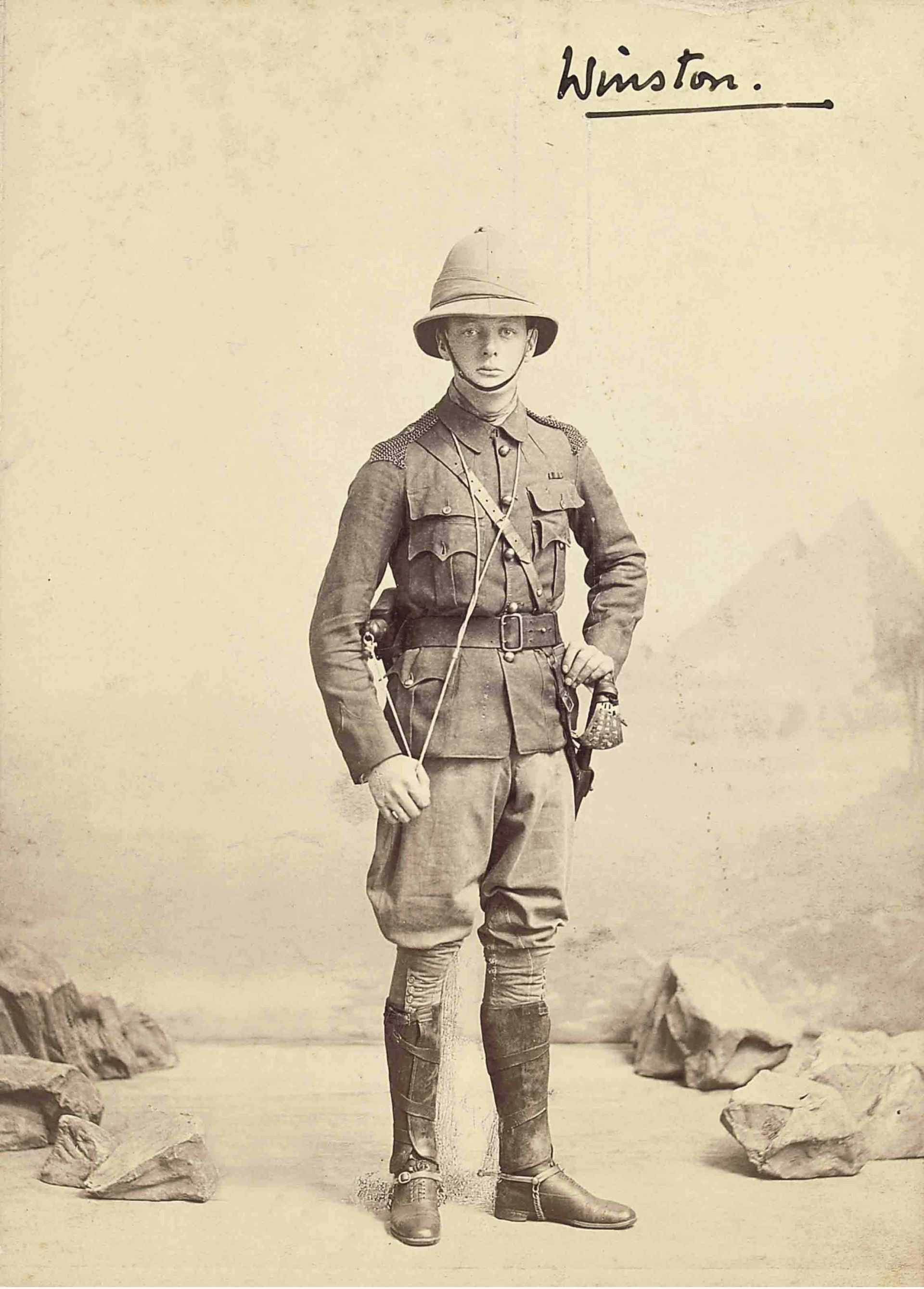
Winston Churchill posing in uniform in front of a backdrop depicting the Egyptian Pyramids, 1898.

Interested in parliamentary affairs, Churchill declared himself "a Liberal in all but name", adding he could never endorse the Liberal Party's support for Irish home rule. Instead, he allied himself to the Tory democracy wing of the Conservatives and on a visit home, gave his first speech for the party's Primrose League at Claverton Down. Mixing reformist and conservative perspectives, he supported the promotion of secular, non-denominational education while opposing women's suffrage.

Churchill volunteered to join Bindon Blood's Malakand Field Force in its campaign against Mohmand rebels in the Swat Valley of north-west India. Blood accepted on condition he was assigned as a journalist, the beginning of Churchill's writing career. He returned to Bangalore in October 1897 and wrote his first book, The Story of the Malakand Field Force, which received positive reviews. He wrote his only work of fiction, Savrola, a Ruritanian romance. To keep occupied, Churchill embraced writing as what Roy Jenkins calls his "whole habit", especially through his career when he was out of office. Writing was his safeguard against recurring depression, which he referred to as his "black dog".

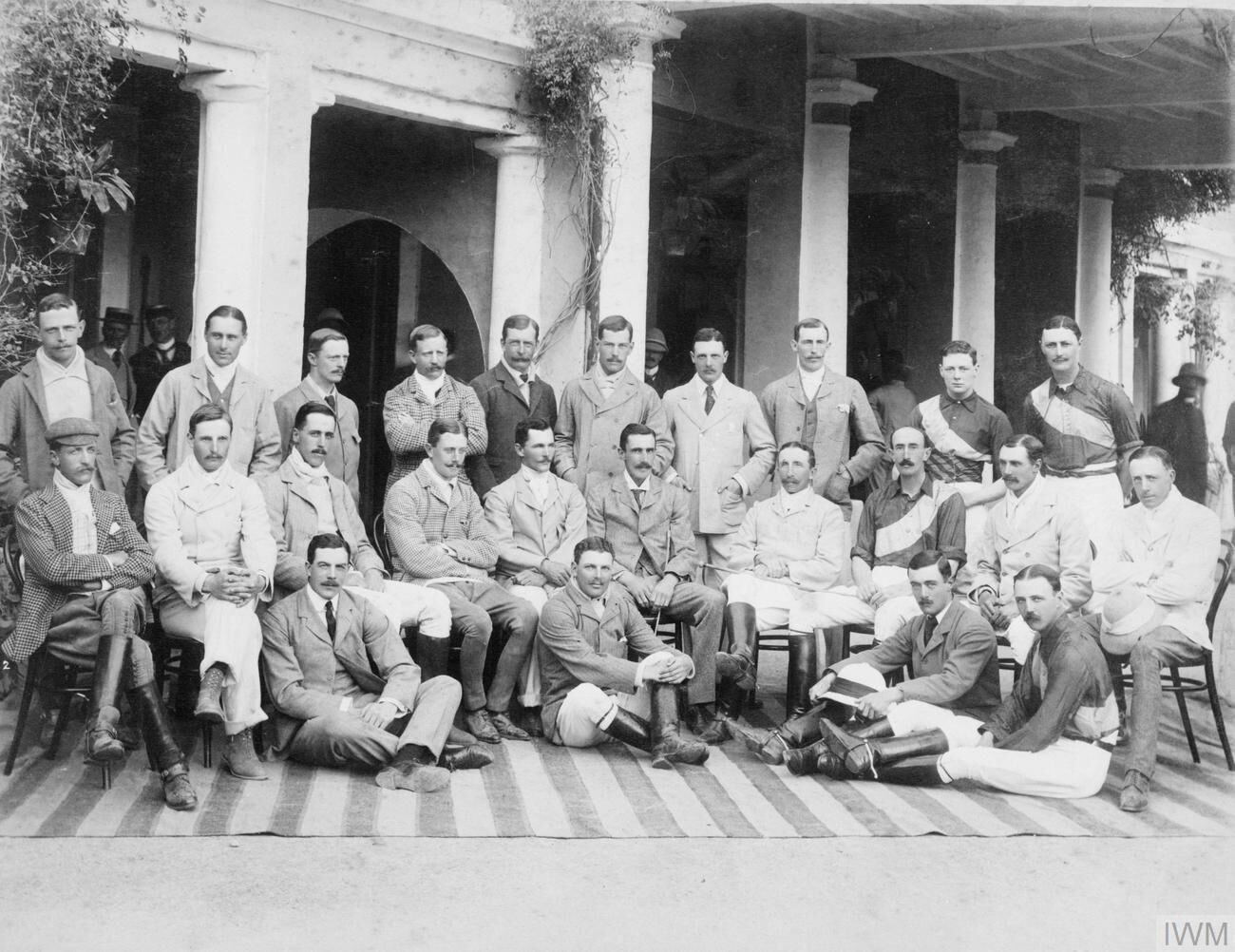
Officers involved in the Inter-Regimental Polo Tournament at Meerut, 1899. Winston Churchill is standing second from right.

Using London contacts, Churchill got attached to General Herbert Kitchener's campaign in the Sudan as a 21st Lancers subaltern, while working as a journalist for The Morning Post. After participating in one of the British Army's last cavalry charges in the Battle of Omdurman in September 1898, the 21st Lancers were stood down. In October, Churchill returned to England and began writing The River War about the campaign; it was published in 1899. He decided to leave the army as he was critical of Kitchener's actions, particularly the unmerciful treatment of enemy wounded and his desecration of Muhammad Ahmad's tomb.

On 2 December 1898, Churchill embarked for India to settle his military business and complete his resignation. He spent much time playing polo, the only ball sport in which he was ever interested. Having left the Hussars, he sailed from Bombay on 20 March 1899, determined to launch a career in politics.

=== Politics and South Africa: 1899–1901 ===
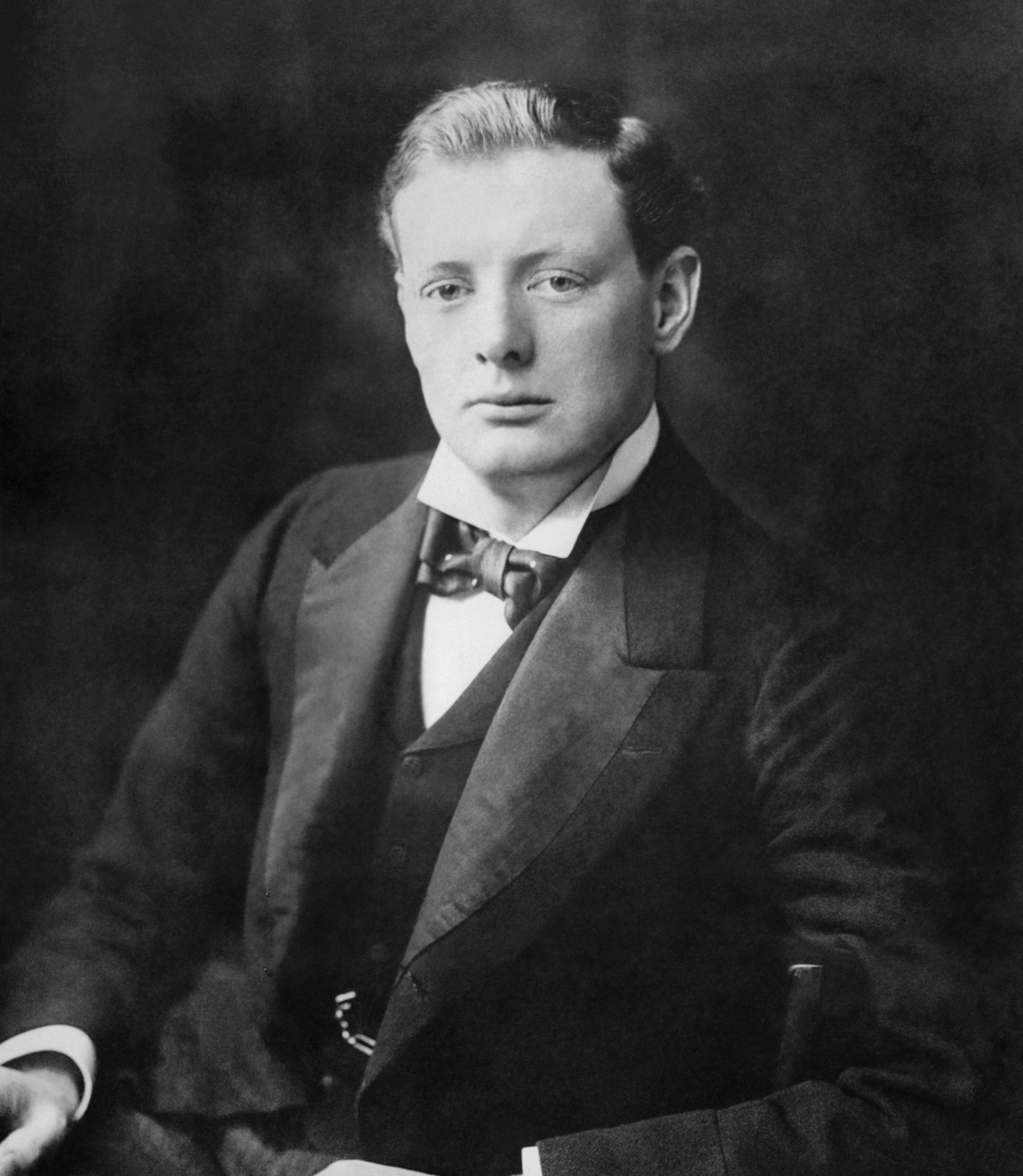
Churchill in 1900 around the time of his first election to Parliament

Churchill spoke at Conservative meetings and was selected as one of the party's two candidates for the June 1899 Oldham by-election. While campaigning, he referred to himself as "a Conservative and a Tory Democrat". Although the seats had been held by the Conservatives, the result was a narrow Liberal victory.

As a journalist for the Morning Post, Churchill anticipated the outbreak of the Second Boer War between Britain and the Boer republics, leading him to sail to South Africa. In October, he travelled to the conflict zone near Ladysmith, which was under siege by Boer troops, and then headed to Colenso. At the Battle of Chieveley, his train was derailed by Boer artillery shelling, and he was captured as a prisoner of war (POW) and interned in a POW camp in Pretoria. Churchill made a formal protest about his internment to the Transvaal Secretary of State, asserting his status as a non-combatant journalist, but he was told he had invalidated that by carrying a revolver. In December, Churchill escaped and evaded his captors by stowing aboard freight trains and hiding in a mine. He made it to safety in Portuguese East Africa. His escape attracted much publicity.

In January 1900, Churchill briefly rejoined the army as a lieutenant in the South African Light Horse regiment, joining Redvers Buller's fight to relieve the Siege of Ladysmith and take Pretoria. He was among the first British troops into both places. With his cousin Charles Spencer-Churchill, 9th Duke of Marlborough, he demanded and received the surrender of 52 Boer prison camp guards. Throughout the war, he publicly chastised anti-Boer prejudices, calling for them to be treated with "generosity and tolerance", and afterwards urged the British to be magnanimous in victory. In July, having resigned his lieutenancy, he returned to Britain. His Morning Post dispatches had been published as London to Ladysmith via Pretoria and sold well.

Churchill rented a flat in London's Mayfair, using it as his base for six years. He stood again as a Conservative candidate at Oldham in the October 1900 general election, securing a narrow victory to become a Member of Parliament aged 25. In the same month, he published Ian Hamilton's March, a book about his South African experiences, which became the focus of a lecture tour in November through Britain, America, and Canada. Members of Parliament were unpaid and the tour was a financial necessity. In America, Churchill met Mark Twain, William McKinley, and Theodore Roosevelt, who he did not get on with. In spring 1901, he gave lectures in Paris, Madrid, and Gibraltar.

== Early political career: 1901–1908 ==
=== Conservative MP: 1901–1904 ===
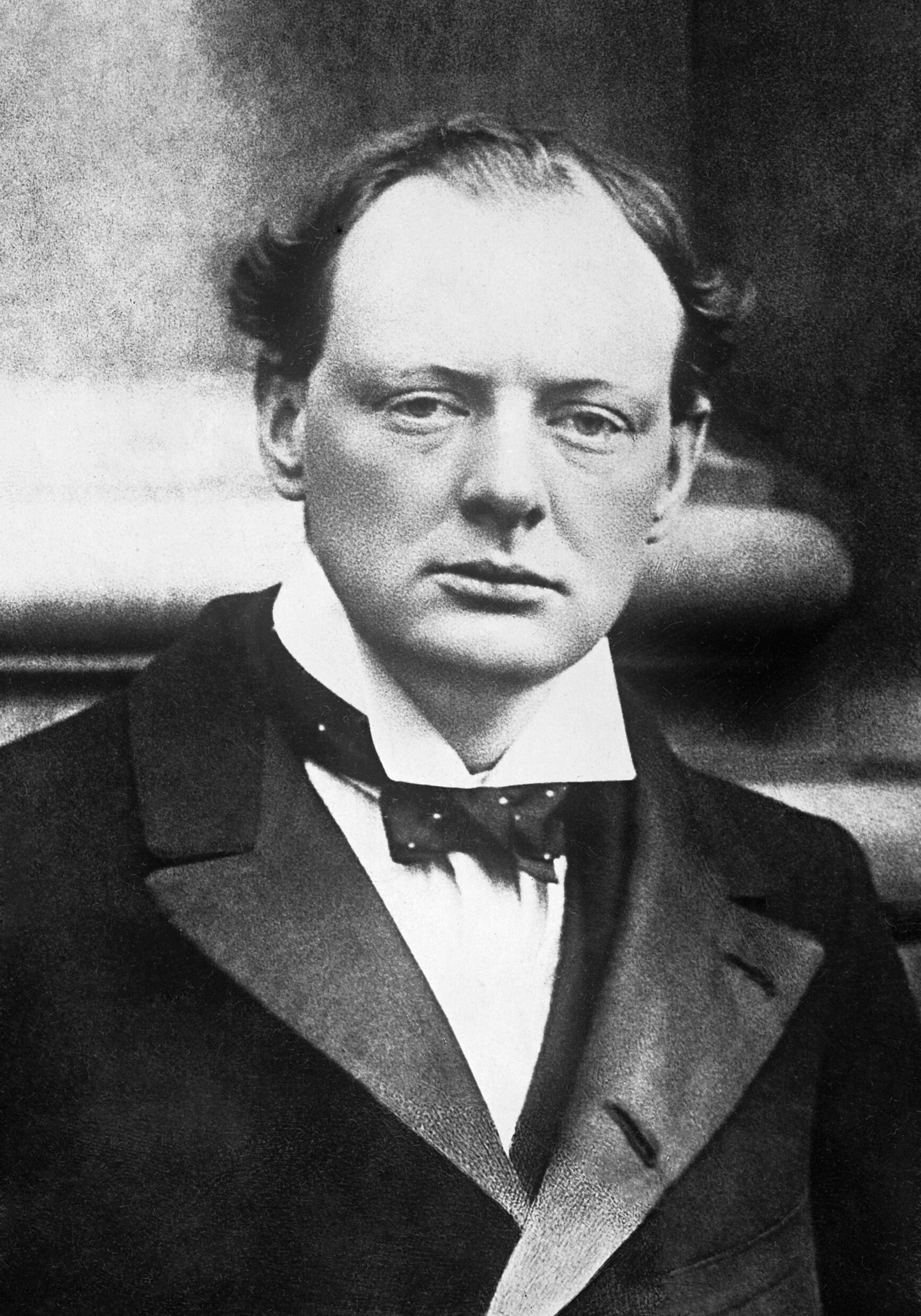
Churchill in 1904 when he "crossed the floor"

In February 1901, Churchill took his seat in the House of Commons, where his maiden speech gained widespread coverage. He associated with a group of Conservatives known as the Hughligans, but was critical of the Conservative government on various issues, especially increases in army funding. He believed additional military expenditure should go to the navy. This upset the Conservative front bench but was supported by Liberals, with whom he increasingly socialised, particularly Liberal Imperialists like H. H. Asquith. Churchill later wrote that he "drifted steadily to the left". He privately considered "the gradual creation by an evolutionary process of a Democratic or Progressive wing to the Conservative Party", or alternately a "Central Party" to unite the Conservatives and Liberals.

By 1903, there was division between Churchill and the Conservatives, largely because he opposed their promotion of protectionism. As a free trader, he helped found the Free Food League. Churchill sensed that the animosity of party members would prevent him gaining a Cabinet position under a Conservative government. The Liberal Party was attracting growing support, and so his defection in 1904 may have been influenced by ambition. He increasingly voted with the Liberals. For example, he opposed an increase in military expenditure, supported a Liberal bill to restore legal rights to trade unions, and opposed the introduction of import tariffs. Arthur Balfour's government announced protectionist legislation in October 1903. Two months later, incensed by Churchill's criticism of the government, the Oldham Conservative Association informed him it would not support his candidature at the next election.

In May 1904, Churchill opposed the government's proposed Aliens Bill, designed to curb Jewish immigration. He stated that the bill would "appeal to insular prejudice against foreigners, to racial prejudice against Jews, and to labour prejudice against competition" and expressed himself in favour of "the old tolerant and generous practice of free entry and asylum to which this country has so long adhered and from which it has so greatly gained". On 31 May 1904, he crossed the floor to sit as a member of the Liberal Party.

=== Liberal MP: 1904–1908 ===
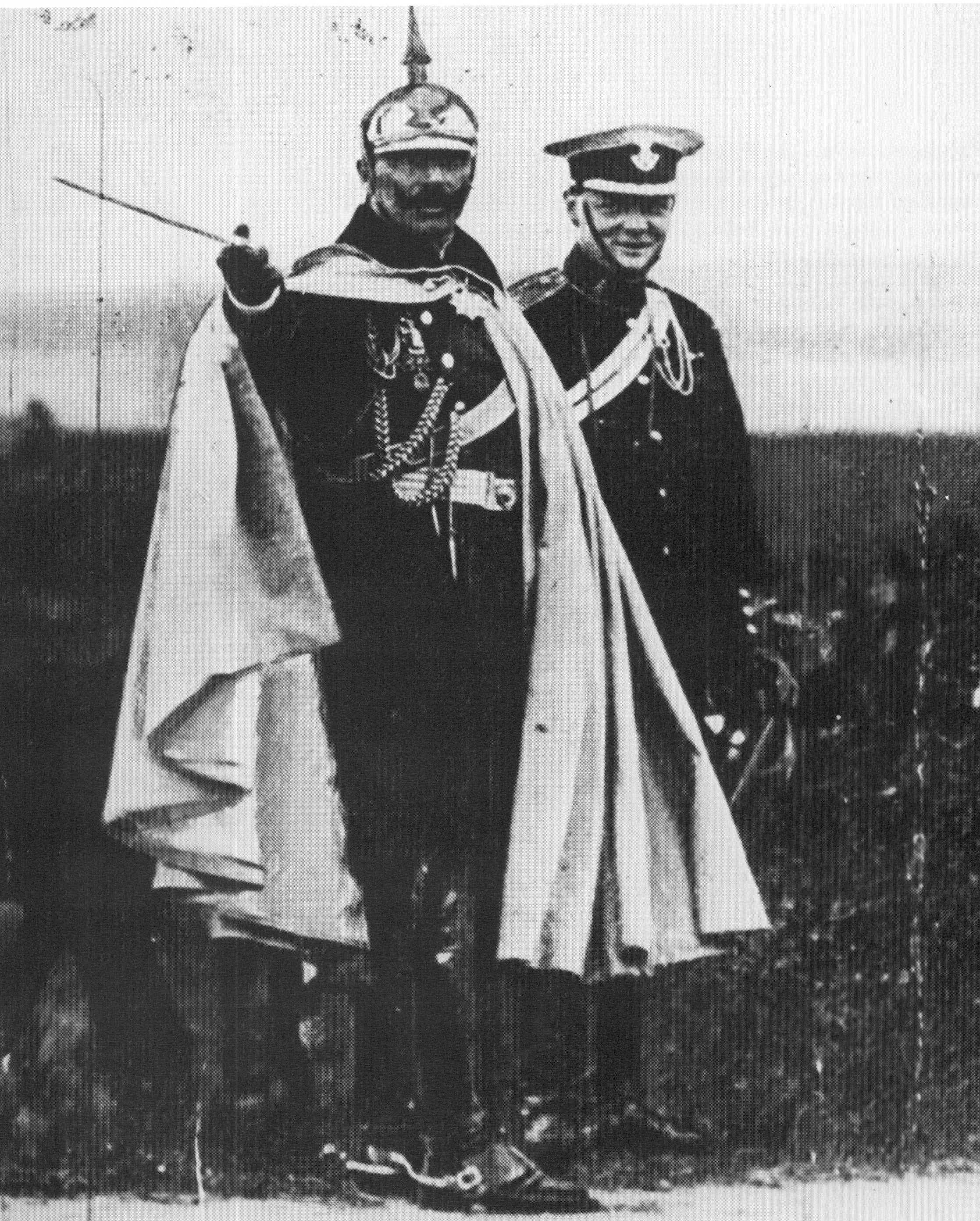
Churchill and German Kaiser Wilhelm II during a military manoeuvre near Breslau, Silesia, in 1906

As a Liberal, Churchill attacked government policy and gained a reputation as a radical under the influences of John Morley and David Lloyd George. In December 1905, Balfour resigned as prime minister and King Edward VII invited the Liberal leader Henry Campbell-Bannerman to replace him. Hoping to secure a working majority, Campbell-Bannerman called a general election in January 1906, which the Liberals won in a massive landslide. Churchill won the Manchester North West seat, and his biography of his father was published, for which he received an advance payment of £8,000. It was generally well received. The first biography of Churchill himself, written by the Liberal MacCallum Scott, was also published around this time.

In the new government, Churchill became Under-Secretary of State for the Colonial Office, a junior ministerial position he had requested. He worked beneath the Secretary of State for the Colonies, Victor Bruce, 9th Earl of Elgin, and took Edward Marsh as his secretary; Marsh remained his secretary for 25 years. Churchill's first task was helping to draft a constitution for the Transvaal; and he helped oversee the formation of a government in the Orange River Colony. In dealing with southern Africa, he sought to ensure equality between the British and Boers. He announced a gradual phasing out of the use of Chinese indentured labourers in South Africa; he and the government decided a sudden ban would cause too much upset and might damage the colony's economy. He expressed concerns about the relations between European settlers and the black African population; after the Zulu launched their Bambatha Rebellion in Natal, Churchill complained about the "disgusting butchery of the natives" by Europeans.

== Asquith government: 1908–1915 ==
=== President of the Board of Trade: 1908–1910 ===
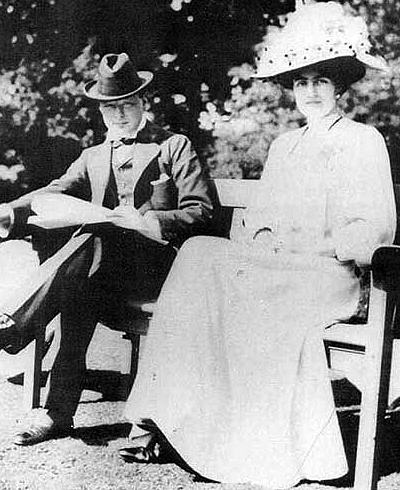
Churchill and his fiancée Clementine Hozier shortly before their marriage in 1908

With Campbell-Bannerman terminally ill, Asquith became prime minister in April 1908. He appointed Churchill as President of the Board of Trade. Aged 33, Churchill was the youngest Cabinet member since 1866. Newly appointed Cabinet ministers were legally obliged to seek re-election at a by-election. On 24 April, Churchill lost the Manchester North West by-election to the Conservative candidate by 429 votes. On 9 May, the Liberals stood him in the safe seat of Dundee, where he won comfortably.

Churchill proposed marriage to Clementine Hozier; they were married on 12 September 1908 at St Margaret's, Westminster and honeymooned in Baveno, Venice, and Veveří Castle in Moravia. They lived at 33 Eccleston Square, London, and their first daughter, Diana, was born in 1909. The success of their marriage was important to Churchill's career as Clementine's unbroken affection provided him with a secure and happy background.

One of Churchill's first tasks as a minister was to arbitrate in an industrial dispute among ship-workers and employers, on the River Tyne. He afterwards established a Standing Court of Arbitration to deal with industrial disputes, establishing a reputation as a conciliator. He worked with Lloyd George to champion social reform. He promoted what he called a "network of State intervention and regulation" akin to that in Germany.

Continuing Lloyd George's work, Churchill introduced the Mines Eight Hours Bill, which prohibited miners from working more than an eight-hour day. In 1909, he introduced the Trade Boards Bill, creating Trade Boards which could prosecute exploitative employers. Passing with a large majority, it established the principle of a minimum wage and the right to have meal breaks. In May 1909, he proposed the Labour Exchanges Bill to establish over 200 Labour Exchanges through which the unemployed would be assisted in finding employment. He promoted the idea of an unemployment insurance scheme, which would be part-funded by the state.

To ensure funding for their reforms, Lloyd George and Churchill denounced Reginald McKenna's policy of naval expansion, refusing to believe war with Germany was inevitable. As Chancellor, Lloyd George presented his "People's Budget" on 29 April 1909, calling it a war budget to eliminate poverty. With Churchill as his closest ally, Lloyd George proposed unprecedented taxes on the rich to fund Liberal welfare programmes. The budget was vetoed by the Conservative peers who dominated the House of Lords. His social reforms under threat, Churchill became president of the Budget League, and warned that upper-class obstruction could anger working-class Britons and lead to class war. The government called the January 1910 general election, which resulted in a Liberal victory; Churchill retained his seat at Dundee. He proposed abolition of the House of Lords in a cabinet memo, suggesting it be succeeded by a unicameral system, or smaller second chamber that lacked an in-built advantage for the Conservatives. In April, the Lords relented and the People's Budget passed. Churchill continued to campaign against the House of Lords and assisted passage of the Parliament Act 1911 which reduced and restricted its powers.

=== Home Secretary: 1910–1911 ===
In February 1910, Churchill was promoted to Home Secretary, giving him control over the police and prison services; he implemented a prison reform programme. Measures included a distinction between criminal and political prisoners, with rules for the latter being relaxed. There were educational innovations like the establishment of libraries, and a requirement to stage entertainments four times a year. The rules on solitary confinement were relaxed, and Churchill proposed abolition of automatic imprisonment of those who failed to pay fines. Imprisonment of people aged between 16 and 21 was abolished except for the most serious offences. Churchill reduced ("commuted") 21 of the 43 death ("capital") sentences passed while he was Home Secretary.

A major domestic issue was women's suffrage. Churchill supported giving women the vote, but would only back a bill to that effect if it had majority support from the (male) electorate. His proposed solution was a referendum, but this found no favour with Asquith and women's suffrage remained unresolved until 1918. Many suffragettes believed Churchill was a committed opponent, and targeted his meetings for protest. In November 1910, the suffragist Hugh Franklin attacked Churchill with a whip; Franklin was imprisoned for six weeks.

In November 1910, Churchill dealt with the Tonypandy riots, in which coal miners in the Rhondda Valley violently protested against working conditions. The Chief Constable of Glamorgan requested troops to help police quell the rioting. Churchill initially blocked their deployment, believing that the strike could be de-escalated. 270 London police, not equipped with firearms, were deployed. Subsequently, soldiers were deployed; the troops encountered a disturbance at Porth and called for the Metropolitan Police. More than 500 civilians and 80 police were reportedly injured at Porth, and one miner died from head injuries. As the riots continued, Churchill offered the protesters an interview with the government's chief industrial arbitrator, which they accepted. Privately, he regarded the mine owners and striking miners as "very unreasonable". The Times and other media outlets accused him of being soft on the rioters; in contrast, many in the Labour Party regarded him as too heavy-handed. Churchill incurred the long-term suspicion of the labour movement.

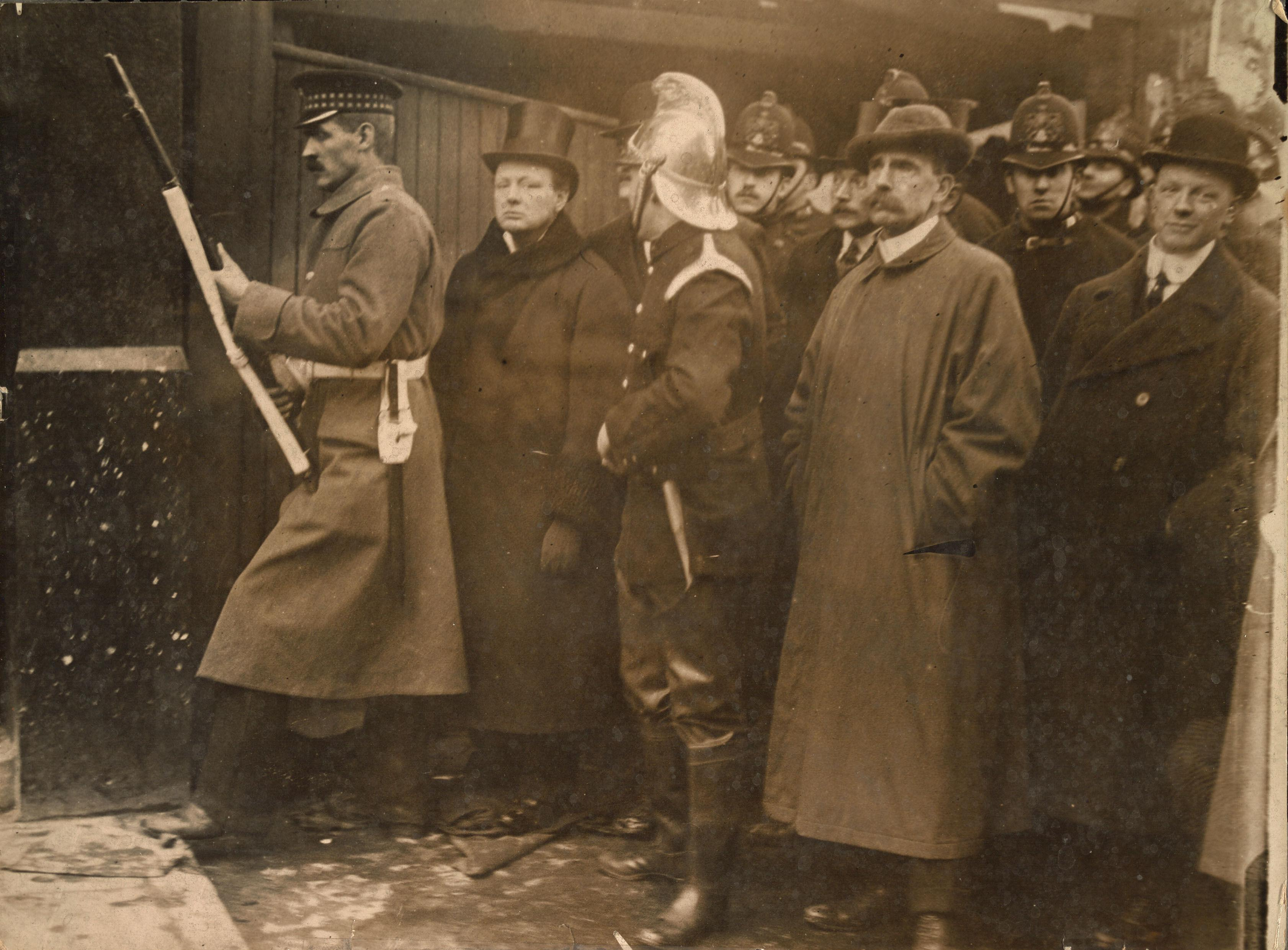
Churchill (second left) photographed at the Siege of Sidney Street

Asquith called a general election in December 1910, and the Liberals were re-elected with Churchill secure in Dundee. In January 1911, Churchill became involved in the Siege of Sidney Street; three Latvian burglars had killed police officers and hidden in a house in the East End of London, surrounded by police. Churchill stood with the police though he did not direct their operation. After the house caught fire, he told the fire brigade not to proceed into the house because of the threat posed by the armed men. Afterwards, two of the burglars were found dead. Although he faced criticism for his decision, he said he "thought it better to let the house burn down rather than spend good British lives in rescuing those ferocious rascals".

In March 1911, Churchill introduced the second reading of the Coal Mines Bill; when implemented, it imposed stricter safety standards. He formulated the Shops Bill to improve working conditions of shop workers; it faced opposition from shop owners and only passed in a much weakened form. In April, Lloyd George introduced the first health and unemployment insurance legislation, the National Insurance Act 1911, which Churchill had been instrumental in drafting. In May, Clementine gave birth to their second child, Randolph, named after Winston's father. In response to escalating civil strife in 1911, Churchill sent troops into Liverpool to quell protesting dockers and rallied against a national railway strike.

During the Agadir Crisis of April 1911, when there was a threat of war between France and Germany, Churchill suggested an alliance with France and Russia to safeguard the independence of Belgium, Denmark and the Netherlands to counter possible German expansionism. The Crisis had a profound effect on Churchill and altered his views about the need for naval expansion.

=== First Lord of the Admiralty ===
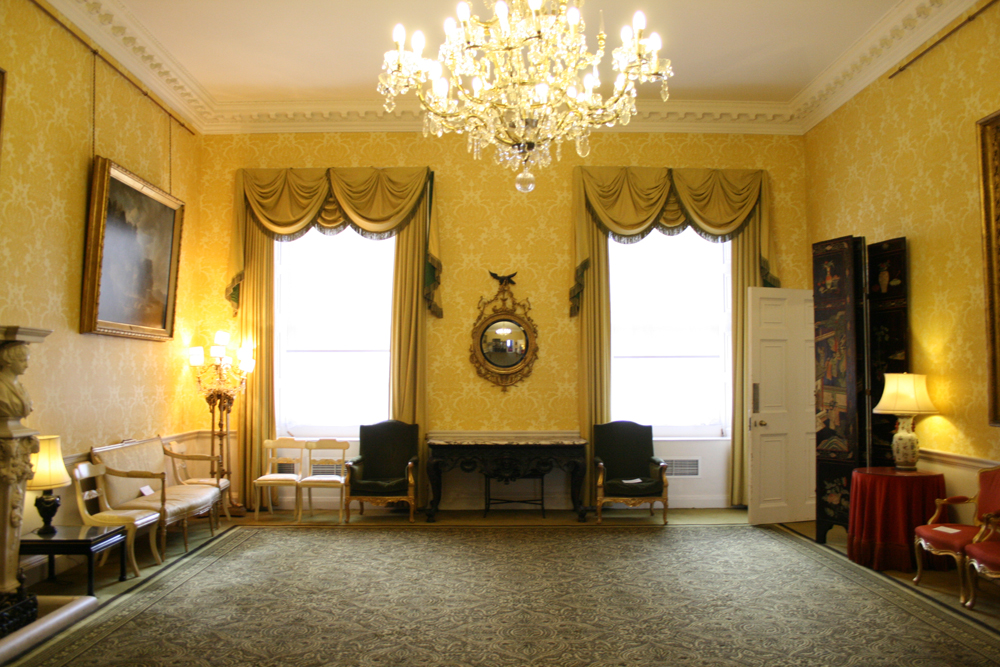
As First Lord of the Admiralty, Churchill's London residency was Admiralty House.

In October 1911, Asquith appointed Churchill First Lord of the Admiralty, and he took up official residence at Admiralty House. He created a naval war staff and, over the next two and a half years, focused on naval preparation, visiting naval stations and dockyards, seeking to improve morale, and scrutinising German naval developments. After Germany passed its 1912 Naval Law to increase warship production, Churchill vowed that for every new German battleship, Britain would build two. He invited Germany to engage in a mutual de-escalation, but this was refused.

Churchill pushed for higher pay and greater recreational facilities for naval staff, more submarines, and a renewed focus on the Royal Naval Air Service, encouraging them to experiment with how aircraft could be used for military purposes. He coined the term "seaplane" and ordered 100 to be constructed. Some Liberals objected to his level of naval expenditure; in December 1913 he threatened to resign if his proposal for four new battleships in 1914–15 was rejected. In June 1914, he convinced the House of Commons to authorise the government purchase of a 51% share in the profits of the Anglo-Persian Oil Company, to secure oil access for the navy.

The central issue in Britain was Irish Home Rule and, in 1912, Asquith's government introduced the Home Rule Bill. Churchill urged Ulster Unionists to accept it as he opposed the Partition of Ireland. He stated: "Whatever Ulster's right may be, she cannot stand in the way of the whole of the rest of Ireland. Half a province cannot impose a permanent veto on the nation. Half a province cannot obstruct forever the reconciliation between the British and Irish democracies". Following a Cabinet decision, he boosted the naval presence in Ireland to deal with any Unionist uprising. Seeking a compromise, Churchill suggested Ireland remain part of a federal UK, but this angered Liberals and Irish nationalists.

As First Lord, Churchill was tasked with overseeing Britain's naval effort when the First World War began in August 1914. The navy transported 120,000 troops to France and began a blockade of Germany's North Sea ports. Churchill sent submarines to the Baltic Sea to assist the Russian Navy and sent the Marine Brigade to Ostend, forcing a reallocation of German troops. In September, Churchill assumed full responsibility for Britain's aerial defence. On 7 October, Clementine gave birth to their third child, Sarah. In October, Churchill visited Antwerp to observe Belgian defences against the besieging Germans and promised reinforcements. Soon afterwards, Antwerp fell to the Germans and Churchill was criticised in the press. He maintained that his actions had prolonged resistance and enabled the Allies to secure Calais and Dunkirk. In November, Asquith called a War Council including Churchill. Churchill set the development of the tank on the right track and financed its creation with Admiralty funds.

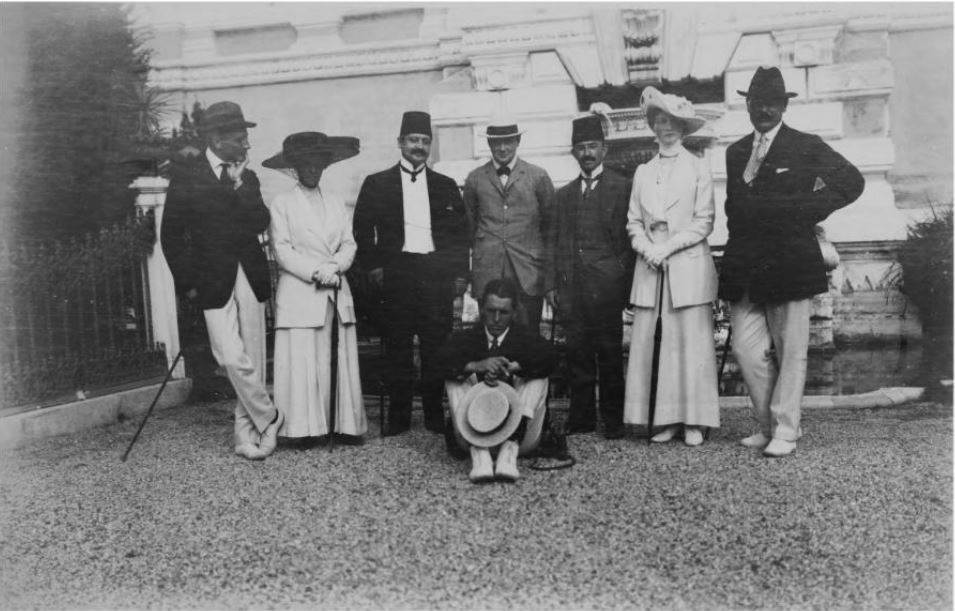
Winston Churchill between Talaat Bey and Cavid Bey (both wearing fezzes) during his private stay in Istanbul in July 1910

Churchill was interested in the Middle Eastern theatre, and wanted to relieve pressure on the Russians in the Caucasus by staging attacks against Turkey in the Dardanelles. He hoped that the British could even seize Constantinople. Approval was given and, in March 1915, an Anglo-French task force attempted a naval bombardment of Turkish defences. In April, the Mediterranean Expeditionary Force, including the Australian and New Zealand Army Corps (ANZAC), began its assault at Gallipoli. Both campaigns failed and Churchill was held responsible by many MPs, particularly Conservatives. In May, Asquith agreed under parliamentary pressure to form an all-party coalition government, but the Conservatives' condition of entry was that Churchill be removed from the Admiralty.

== Military service, 1915–1916 ==
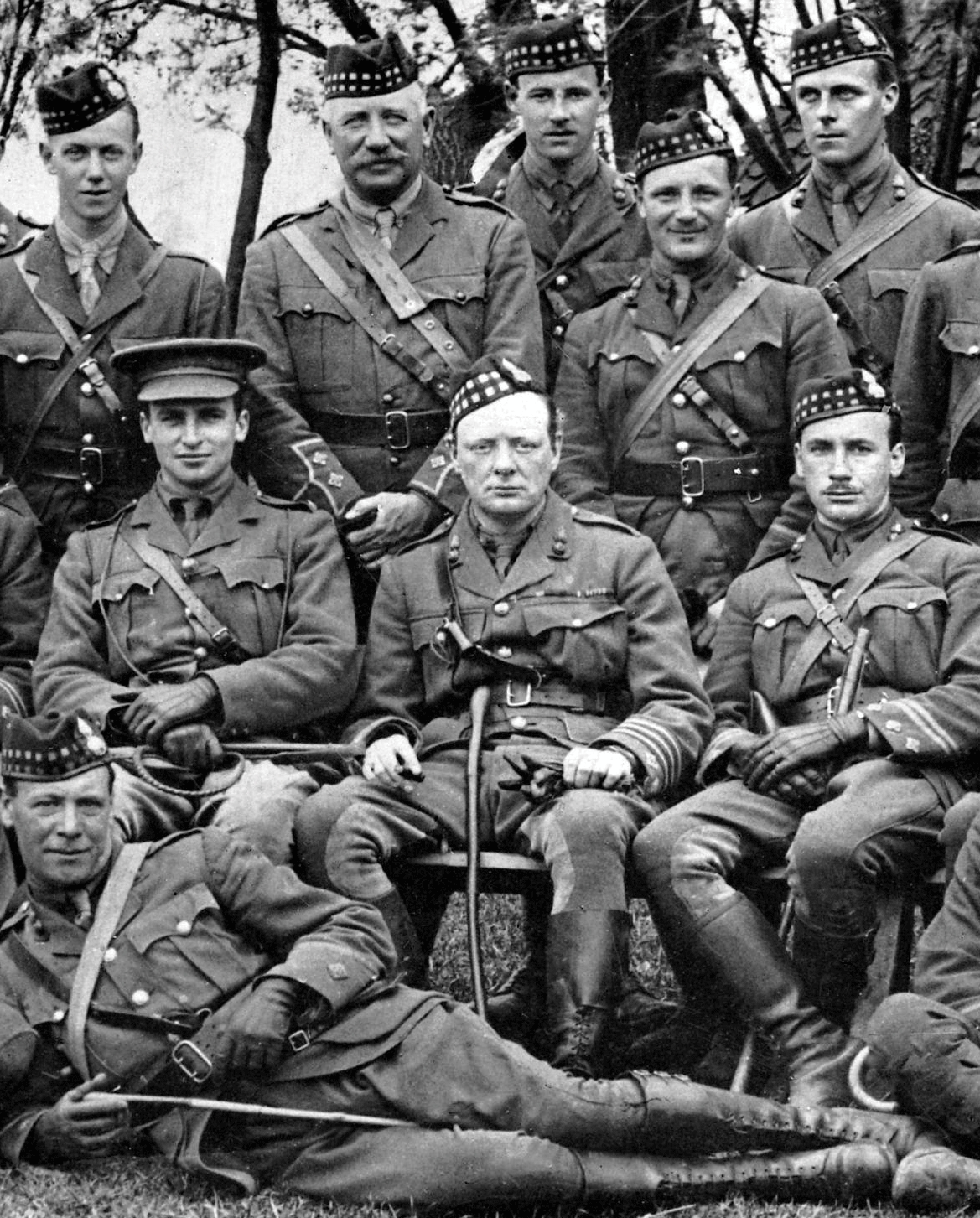
Churchill commanding the 6th Battalion, the Royal Scots Fusiliers, 1916.

On 25 November 1915, Churchill resigned from the government, although he remained an MP. Asquith rejected his request to be appointed Governor-General of British East Africa. Churchill decided to return to active service with the Army and was attached to the 2nd Grenadier Guards, on the Western Front. In January 1916, he was temporarily promoted to lieutenant-colonel and given command of the 6th Royal Scots Fusiliers. The battalion was moved to the Belgian Front near Ploegsteert. For three months, they faced continual shelling, though no German offensive. Churchill narrowly escaped death when, during a visit by his cousin the Duke of Marlborough, a large piece of shrapnel fell between them. In May, the 6th Royal Scots Fusiliers were merged into the 15th Division and Churchill secured permission to leave active service. His temporary promotion ended on 16 May 1916, when he returned to the rank of major.

Back in the House of Commons, Churchill spoke out on war issues, calling for conscription to be extended to the Irish, greater recognition of soldiers' bravery, and for the introduction of steel helmets. In November 1916 he penned "The greater application of mechanical power to the prosecution of an offensive on land", but it fell on deaf ears. He was frustrated at being out of office, but was repeatedly blamed for the Gallipoli disaster by the pro-Conservative press. Churchill argued his case before the Dardanelles Commission, whose report placed no blame on him personally for the campaign's failure.

== Lloyd George government: 1916–1922 ==
=== Minister of Munitions: 1917–1919 ===
In October 1916, Asquith resigned as prime minister and was succeeded by Lloyd George who, in May 1917, sent Churchill to inspect the French war effort. In July, Churchill was appointed Minister of Munitions. He negotiated an end to a strike in munitions factories along the Clyde and increased munitions production. In his October 1917 letter to his Cabinet colleagues, he penned the plan of attack that would bring final victory to the Allies. He ended a second strike, in June 1918, by threatening to conscript strikers into the army. In the House of Commons, Churchill voted in support of the Representation of the People Act 1918, which gave some women the right to vote. In November 1918, four days after the Armistice, Churchill's fourth child, Marigold, was born.

=== Secretary of State for War and Air: 1919–1921 ===
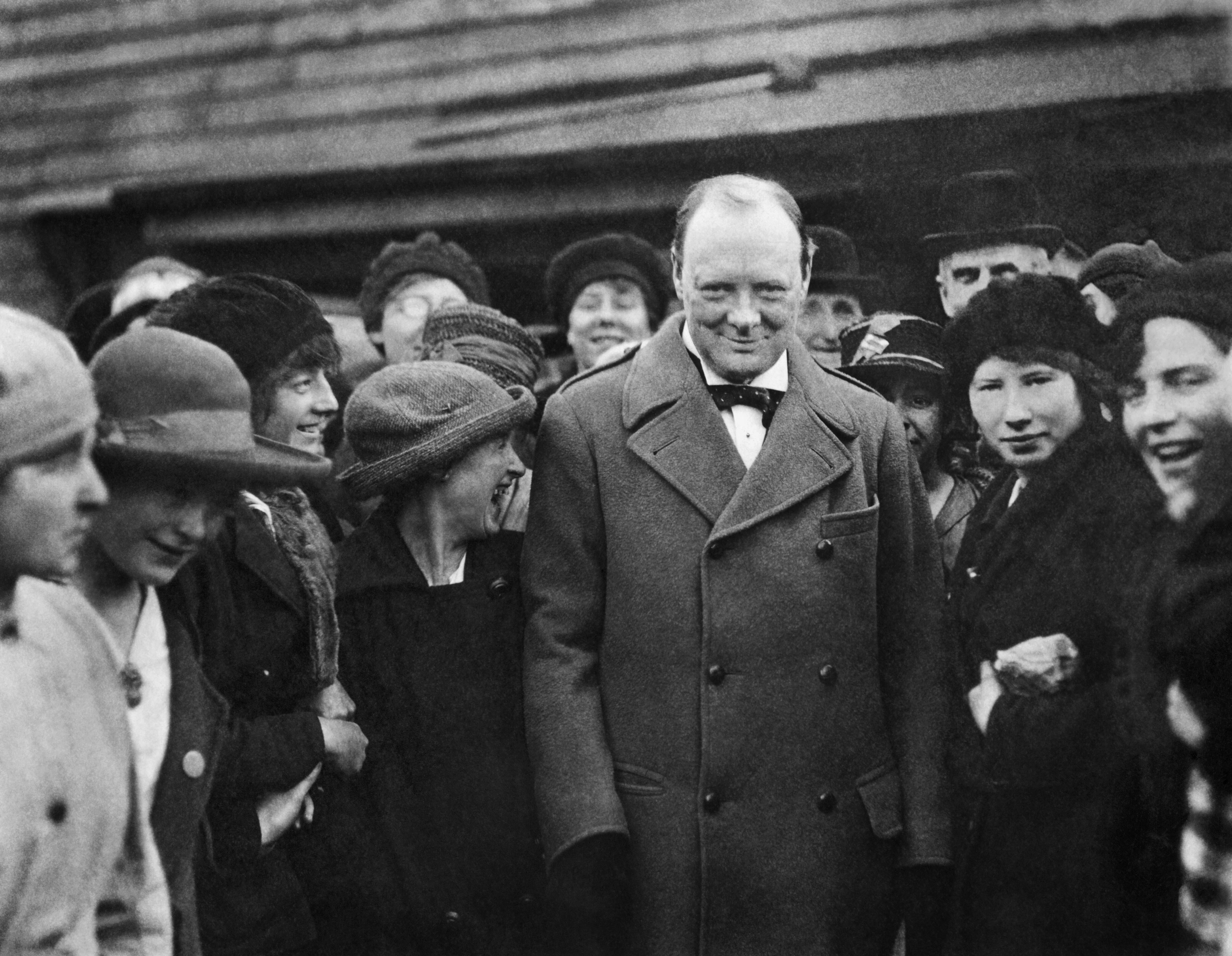
Churchill meets female workers at Georgetown's filling works near Glasgow in October 1918.

Lloyd George called a general election for 14 December 1918. During the campaign, Churchill called for nationalisation of the railways, a control on monopolies, tax reform, and the creation of a League of Nations to prevent wars. He was returned as MP for Dundee and, though the Conservatives won a majority, Lloyd George was retained as prime minister. In January 1919, Lloyd George moved Churchill to the War Office as both Secretary of State for War and Secretary of State for Air.

Churchill was responsible for demobilising the army, though he convinced Lloyd George to keep a million men conscripted for the British Army of the Rhine. Churchill was one of the few government figures who opposed harsh measures against Germany, and he cautioned against demobilising the German Army, warning they might be needed as a bulwark against Soviet Russia; he was outspoken against Vladimir Lenin's Bolshevik government. He initially supported using British troops to assist the anti-Bolshevik White forces in the Russian Civil War, but soon recognised the people's desire to bring them home. After the Soviets won the civil war, Churchill proposed a cordon sanitaire around the country.

In the Irish War of Independence, he supported the use of the paramilitary Black and Tans to combat Irish revolutionaries. After British troops in Iraq clashed with Kurdish rebels, Churchill authorised two squadrons to the area, proposing they be equipped with "poison gas" to be used to "inflict punishment upon recalcitrant natives without inflicting grave injury upon them", although this was never implemented. He saw the occupation of Iraq as a drain on Britain and proposed, unsuccessfully, that the government should hand control back to Turkey.

=== Secretary of State for the Colonies: 1921–1922 ===
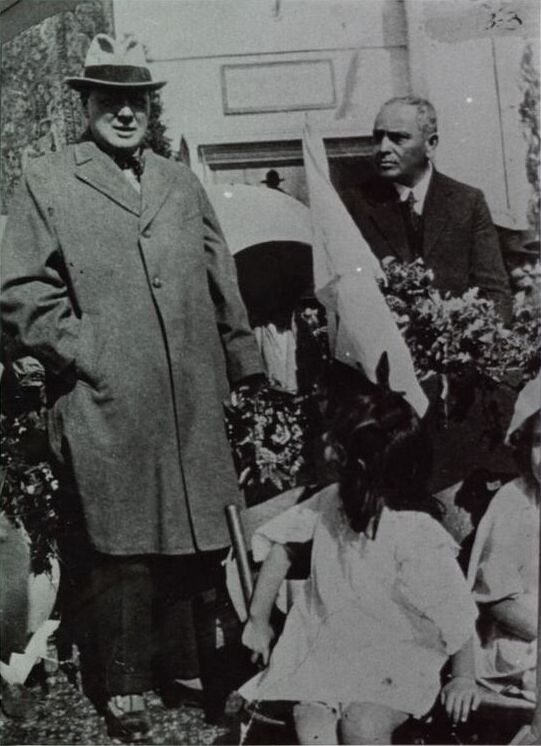
Churchill as Secretary of State for the Colonies during his visit to Mandatory Palestine, Tel Aviv, 1921

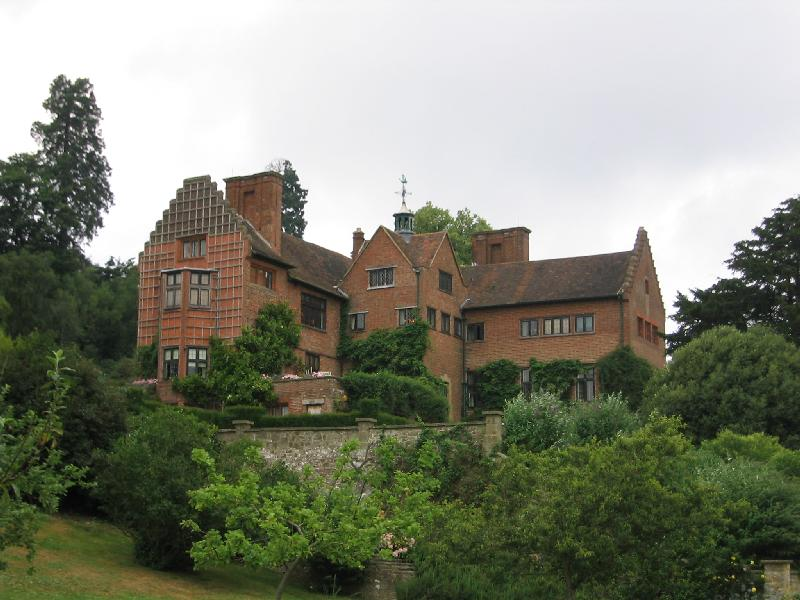
Churchill's main home was Chartwell in Kent.

Churchill became Secretary of State for the Colonies in February 1921. He used his new position to push his earlier plan for aerial bombing of Iraq. Cabinet approved it in August and eight RAF squadrons were sent to Iraq the next year. One was commanded by Arthur Harris, who boasted that "within 45 minutes a full-sized village ... can be practically wiped out." Japanese historian Yuki Tanaka says this precedent, along with Italy, of "indiscriminate bombing" "to terrorize enemy civilians" of "uncivilized races" led to its extension to Europeans in the Second World War.

In March, the first exhibit of his paintings took place in Paris, with Churchill exhibiting under a pseudonym. In May, his mother died, followed in August by his daughter Marigold, from sepsis. Churchill was haunted by Marigold's death for the rest of his life.

Churchill was involved in negotiations with Sinn Féin leaders and helped draft the Anglo-Irish Treaty. He was responsible for reducing the cost of occupying the Middle East, and was involved in the installations of Faisal I of Iraq and Abdullah I of Jordan. Churchill travelled to Mandatory Palestine where, as a supporter of Zionism, he refused an Arab Palestinian petition to prohibit Jewish migration. He did allow temporary restrictions following the Jaffa riots.

In January 1921, a train crash in Wales killed a cousin, Lord Herbert Vane-Tempest, with whom Churchill shared a great-grandmother, Frances Vane, Marchioness of Londonderry. He inherited from her Irish estate, which yielded approximately £55,000. This capital enabled him to begin searching for a small country estate.

In September 1922, the Chanak Crisis erupted as Turkish forces threatened to occupy the Dardanelles neutral zone, which was policed by the British army based in Chanak. Churchill and Lloyd George favoured military resistance to any Turkish advance but the majority Conservatives in the coalition government opposed it. A political debacle ensued which resulted in the Conservative withdrawal from the government, precipitating the November 1922 general election.

Also in September, Churchill's fifth and last child, Mary, was born, and in the same month he purchased Chartwell, in Kent, which became his family home. In October 1922, he underwent an appendectomy. While he was in hospital, Lloyd George's coalition was dissolved. In the general election, Churchill lost his Dundee seat to Edwin Scrymgeour, a prohibitionist candidate. Later, he wrote that he was "without an office, without a seat, without a party, and without an appendix". He was elevated as one of 50 members of the Order of the Companions of Honour, as named in Lloyd George's 1922 Dissolution Honours list.

== Out of Parliament: 1922–1924 ==
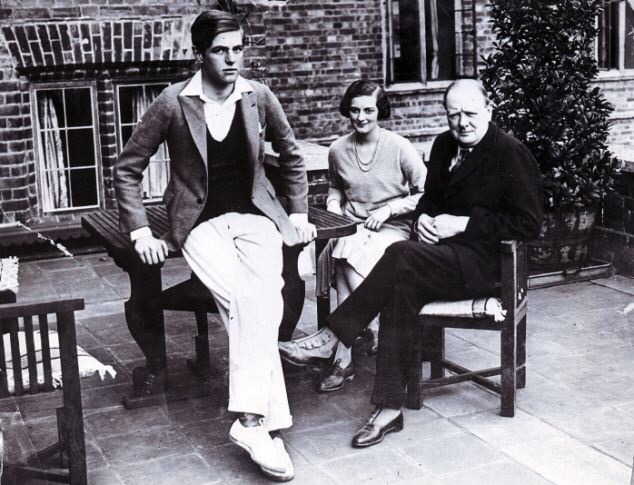
Churchill with son Randolph and daughter Diana in 1923

Churchill spent much of the next six months at the Villa Rêve d'Or near Cannes, painting and writing his memoirs. He wrote an autobiographical history of the war, The World Crisis. The first volume was published in April 1923 and the rest over the next ten years. After the 1923 general election was called, seven Liberal associations asked Churchill to stand as their candidate; he selected Leicester West but did not win. A Labour government led by Ramsay MacDonald took power. Churchill had hoped they would be defeated by a Conservative-Liberal coalition. He strongly opposed the MacDonald government's decision to loan money to Soviet Russia and feared the signing of an Anglo-Soviet Treaty.

In March 1924, alienated by Liberal support for Labour, Churchill stood as an independent anti-socialist candidate in the Westminster Abbey by-election but was defeated. In May, he addressed a Conservative meeting in Liverpool and declared there was no longer a place for the Liberal Party in politics. He said that Liberals must back the Conservatives to stop Labour and ensure "the successful defeat of socialism". In July, he agreed with Conservative leader Stanley Baldwin that he would be selected as a Conservative candidate in the next general election, which was held on 29 October. Churchill stood at Epping, but described himself as a "Constitutionalist". The Conservatives were victorious, and Baldwin formed the new government. Although Churchill had no background in finance or economics, Baldwin appointed him as Chancellor.

== Chancellor of the Exchequer: 1924–1929 ==
Becoming Chancellor on 6 November 1924, Churchill formally rejoined the Conservative Party a year later. As Chancellor, he intended to pursue his free trade principles in the form of laissez-faire economics, as under the Liberal social reforms. In April 1925, he controversially, albeit reluctantly, restored the gold standard in his first budget, at its 1914 parity, against the advice of leading economists including John Maynard Keynes. The return to gold is held to have caused deflation and resultant unemployment with a devastating impact on the coal industry. Churchill presented five budgets to April 1929. Among his measures were reduction of the state pension age from 70 to 65; immediate provision of widow's pensions; reduction of military expenditure; income tax reductions and imposition of taxes on luxury items.

During the General Strike of 1926, Churchill edited the British Gazette, the government's anti-strike propaganda newspaper. After the strike, he acted as an intermediary between striking miners and their employers. He called for the introduction of a legally binding minimum wage. In a House of Commons speech in 1926, Churchill stated that Ireland should be united within itself, and also "united to the British Empire." In early 1927, Churchill visited Rome where he met Mussolini, whom he praised for his stand against Leninism.

== "Wilderness Years": 1929–1939 ==
=== Marlborough and the India Question: 1929–1932 ===
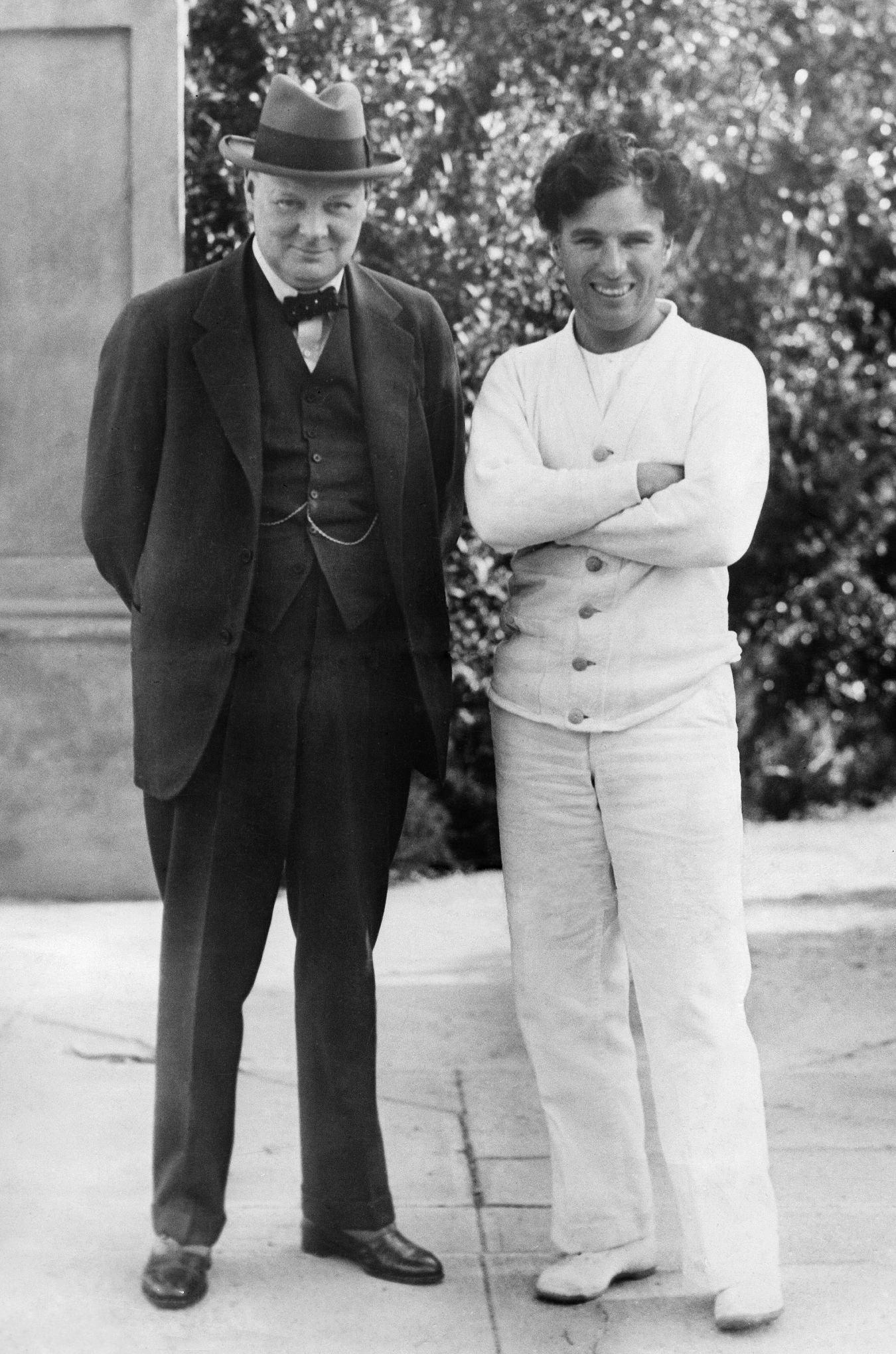
Churchill meeting with film star Charlie Chaplin in 1929

In the 1929 general election, Churchill retained his Epping seat, but the Conservatives were defeated, and MacDonald formed his second Labour government. Out of office, Churchill was prone to depression (his "black dog") but addressed it by writing. He began work on Marlborough: His Life and Times, a biography of his ancestor John Churchill, 1st Duke of Marlborough. He had developed a reputation for being a heavy drinker, although Jenkins believes that was often exaggerated.

Hoping that the Labour government could be ousted, he gained Baldwin's approval to work towards establishing a Conservative-Liberal coalition, although many Liberals were reluctant. In October 1930, after his return from a trip to North America, Churchill published his autobiography, My Early Life, which sold well and was translated into multiple languages. In January 1931, Churchill resigned from the Conservative Shadow Cabinet because Baldwin supported the government's decision to grant Dominion status to India. Churchill believed that enhanced home rule status would hasten calls for full independence. He was particularly opposed to Mohandas Gandhi, whom he considered "a seditious Middle Temple lawyer, now posing as a fakir". His views enraged Labour and Liberal opinion, though he was supported by many grassroot Conservatives.

The October 1931 general election was a landslide victory for the Conservatives. Churchill nearly doubled his majority in Epping, but was not given a ministerial position. The Commons debated Dominion Status for India on 3 December and Churchill insisted on dividing the House, but this backfired as only 43 MPs supported him. He embarked on a lecture tour of North America, hoping to recoup financial losses sustained in the Wall Street crash. On 13 December, Churchill was crossing Fifth Avenue in New York City when he was knocked down by a car, suffering a head injury from which he developed neuritis. To further his convalescence, he and Clementine took ship to Nassau for three weeks, but Churchill became depressed about his financial and political losses. He returned to America in late January 1932 and completed most of his lectures before arriving home on 18 March.

Having worked on Marlborough for much of 1932, Churchill in August decided to visit his ancestor's battlefields. In Munich, he met Ernst Hanfstaengl, a friend of Nazi leader Adolf Hitler, who was then rising in prominence. Hanfstaengl tried to arrange a meeting between Churchill and Hitler, but Hitler was unenthusiastic: "What on earth would I talk to him about?" Soon after visiting Blenheim, Churchill was affected by paratyphoid fever and spent two weeks at a sanatorium in Salzburg. He returned to Chartwell on 25 September, still working on Marlborough. Two days later, he collapsed after a recurrence of paratyphoid which caused an ulcer to haemorrhage. He was taken to a London nursing home and remained there until late October.

=== Warnings about Germany and the abdication crisis: 1933–1936 ===
In January 1933, Churchill was quick to realise the threat posed by Hitler's regime. He expressed alarm that the British government had reduced RAF spending, and warned that Germany's Luftwaffe would soon be a more powerful air force. Armed with data provided clandestinely by senior civil servants, Desmond Morton and Ralph Wigram, Churchill was able to speak with authority about what was happening in Germany, and spoke of his concerns in a radio broadcast in November 1934, having denounced the intolerance and militarism of Nazism in the House of Commons. While Churchill regarded Mussolini's regime as a bulwark against the threat of communist revolution, he opposed the Italian invasion of Ethiopia, despite describing the country as a primitive, uncivilised nation. He admired the exiled king of Spain Alfonso XIII, and feared communism was making inroads during the Spanish Civil War. He referred to Franco's army as the "anti-red movement", but later became critical of Franco as too close to Mussolini and Hitler.

Between October 1933 and September 1938, the four volumes of Marlborough: His Life and Times were published and sold well. The India Bill passed in February 1935; Churchill and 83 other Conservative MPs voted against it. In June 1935, MacDonald resigned and was succeeded as prime minister by Baldwin. Baldwin then led the Conservatives to victory in the 1935 general election; Churchill retained his seat, but was again left out of the government. In January 1936, Edward VIII succeeded George V as monarch. His desire to marry an American divorcee, Wallis Simpson, caused the abdication crisis. Churchill supported Edward and clashed with Baldwin on the issue. Afterwards, although Churchill immediately pledged loyalty to George VI, he wrote that the abdication was "premature and probably quite unnecessary".

=== Anti-appeasement: 1937–1939 ===
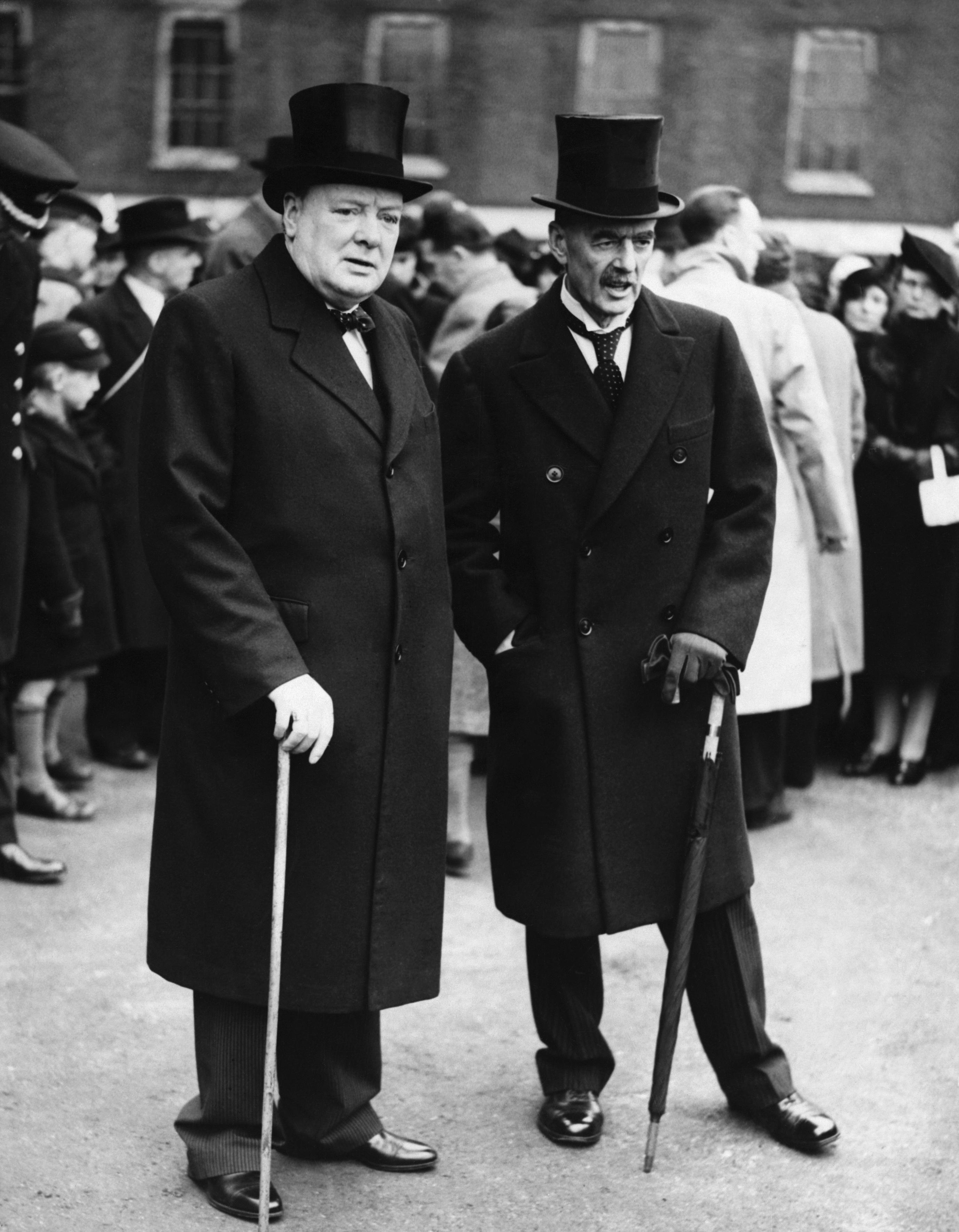
Churchill and Neville Chamberlain, the chief proponent of appeasement

In May 1937, Baldwin resigned and was succeeded as prime minister by Neville Chamberlain. At first, Churchill welcomed Chamberlain's appointment but, in February 1938, matters came to a head after Foreign Secretary Anthony Eden resigned over Chamberlain's appeasement of Mussolini, a policy which Chamberlain was extending towards Hitler. In 1938, Churchill warned the government against appeasement and called for collective action to deter German aggression. Following the Anschluss, Churchill spoke in the House of Commons:

A country like ours, possessed of immense territory and wealth, whose defence has been neglected, cannot avoid war by dilating upon its horrors, or even by a continuous display of pacific qualities, or by ignoring the fate of the victims of aggression elsewhere. War will be avoided, in present circumstances, only by the accumulation of deterrents against the aggressor.

He began calling for a mutual defence pact among European states threatened by German expansionism, arguing this was the only way to halt Hitler. In September, Germany mobilised to invade the Sudetenland in Czechoslovakia. Churchill visited Chamberlain and urged him to tell Germany that Britain would declare war if the Germans invaded Czechoslovak territory; Chamberlain was unwilling to do this. On 30 September, Chamberlain signed the Munich Agreement, agreeing to allow German annexation of the Sudetenland. Speaking in the House of Commons on 5 October, Churchill described the agreement as "a total and unmitigated defeat". Following the dismemberment of Czechoslovakia in March 1939, Churchill and his supporters called for the foundation of a national coalition. His popularity increased as a result.

== First Lord of the Admiralty: September 1939 to May 1940 ==
=== Phoney War and the Norwegian Campaign ===
On 3 September 1939, the day Britain declared war on Germany, Chamberlain reappointed Churchill as First Lord of the Admiralty, and he joined the war cabinet. A high-profile minister during the 'Phoney War', Churchill was ebullient after the Battle of the River Plate on 13 December 1939, and welcomed home the crews, congratulating them on "a brilliant sea fight". On 16 February 1940, Churchill ordered Captain Philip Vian of the destroyer HMS Cossack to board the German supply ship Altmark in Norwegian waters, freeing 299 British merchant seamen who had been captured by the Admiral Graf Spee. These actions, and his speeches, enhanced Churchill's reputation. He was concerned about German naval activity in the Baltic and wanted to send a naval force, but this was soon changed to a plan, codenamed Operation Wilfred, to mine Norwegian waters and stop iron ore shipments to Germany. Due to disagreements, Wilfred was delayed until 8 April 1940, the day before the German invasion of Norway.

=== Norway Debate and Chamberlain's resignation ===
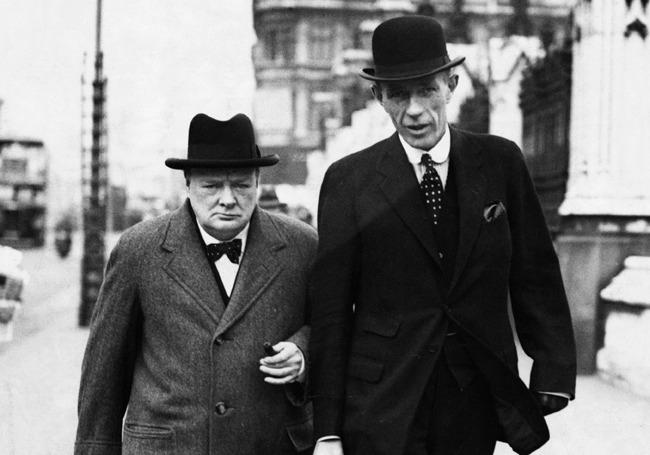
Churchill with Lord Halifax in 1938

After the Allies failed to prevent the German occupation of Norway, the Commons held a debate from 7 to 9 May on the government's conduct of the war, one of the most significant events in parliamentary history. On the second day, the Labour opposition called for a division which was in effect a vote of no confidence in Chamberlain's government. Churchill was called upon to wind up the debate, placing him in the difficult position of having to defend the government without damaging his own prestige. The government won the vote, but its majority was drastically reduced amid calls for a national government.

Early on 10 May, German forces invaded Belgium, Luxembourg, and the Netherlands as a prelude to their assault on France. Since the division vote, Chamberlain had been trying to form a coalition, but Labour declared they would not serve under his leadership, although they would accept another Conservative. The only two candidates were Churchill and Lord Halifax, the Foreign Secretary. Halifax admitted he could not govern effectively as a member of the House of Lords, so Chamberlain advised the King to send for Churchill, who became prime minister. Churchill later wrote of a profound sense of relief, saying that he believed his life so far had been 'a preparation for this hour and for this trial'.

== Prime Minister: 1940–1945 ==
=== Dunkirk to Pearl Harbor: May 1940 to December 1941 ===
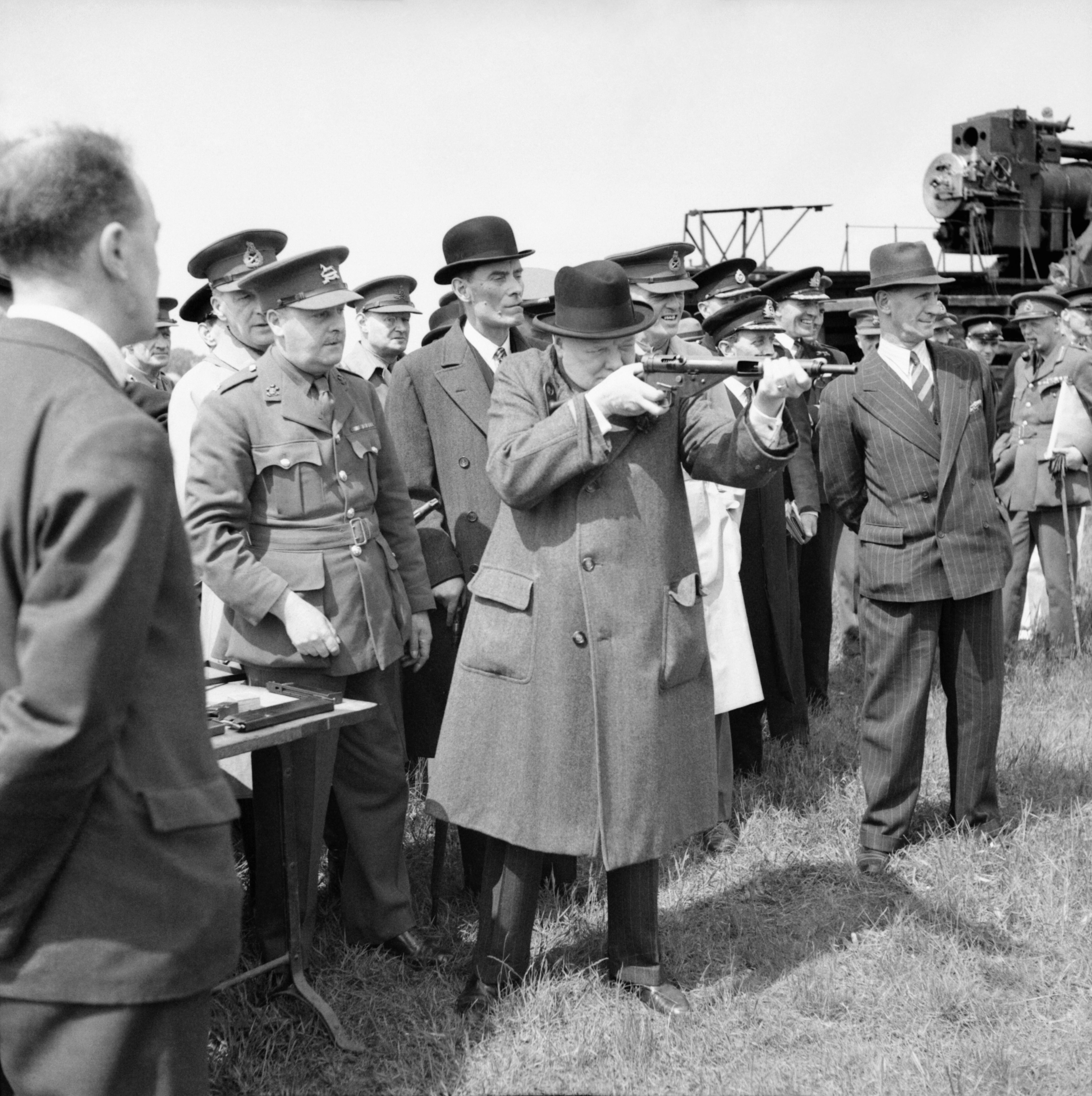
Churchill takes aim with a Sten sub-machine gun in June 1941.

==== War ministry created ====
Churchill began his premiership by forming a war cabinet: Chamberlain as Lord President of the Council, Labour leader Clement Attlee as Lord Privy Seal (later Deputy Prime Minister), Halifax as Foreign Secretary and Labour's Arthur Greenwood as a minister without portfolio. In practice, these five were augmented by the service chiefs and ministers who attended most meetings. The cabinet changed in size and membership as the war progressed, a key appointment being the leading trades unionist Ernest Bevin as Minister of Labour and National Service. In response to criticisms, Churchill created and assumed the position of Minister of Defence, making him the most powerful wartime prime minister in history. He drafted outside experts into government to fulfil vital functions, especially on the Home Front. These included friends like Lord Beaverbrook and Frederick Lindemann, who became the government's scientific advisor.

In May, Churchill had still been unpopular with many Conservatives, and most of the Labour Party. Chamberlain remained Conservative Party leader until October. By then, Churchill had won over his doubters, and his succession as party leader was a formality.

==== Resolve to fight on ====
Churchill succeeded as an orator despite having a speech impediment from childhood. He had a lateral lisp and worked on his pronunciation by repeating phrases designed to cure his problem with the sibilant letter "s". He was ultimately successful, turning the impediment into an asset, as when he called Hitler a "Nar-zee" (rhymes with "khazi"; emphasis on the "z"), rather than a Nazi ("ts"). His first speech as prime minister, delivered to the Commons on 13 May, was the "blood, toil, tears and sweat" speech. Churchill made it plain that a long road lay ahead and that victory was the final goal:

I would say to the House... that I have nothing to offer but blood, toil, tears and sweat. We have before us an ordeal of the most grievous kind. You ask, what is our policy? I will say: it is to wage war, by sea, land and air, with all our might and with all the strength that God can give us; to wage war against a monstrous tyranny, never surpassed in the dark, lamentable catalogue of human crime. That is our policy. You ask, what is our aim? I can answer in one word: it is victory, victory at all costs, victory in spite of all terror, victory, however long and hard the road may be; for without victory, there is no survival.

Churchill's use of rhetoric hardened public opinion against a peaceful resolution – Jenkins says Churchill's speeches were 'an inspiration for the nation, and a catharsis for Churchill himself'.

At the end of May, with the British Expeditionary Force in retreat to Dunkirk and the Fall of France imminent, Halifax proposed the government should explore a peace settlement using the still-neutral Mussolini as an intermediary. There were high-level meetings from 26 to 28 May, including with the French premier Paul Reynaud. Churchill's resolve was to fight on, even if France capitulated, but his position remained precarious. He had the support of Attlee and Greenwood, but knew he could not survive as prime minister if both Chamberlain and Halifax were against him. He called a meeting of the outer cabinet who were solidly behind him, and this won Chamberlain's support; Halifax had been outmanoeuvred.

==== Operation Dynamo and the Battle of France ====
The Dunkirk evacuation of 338,226 Allied servicemen ended on 4 June when the French rearguard surrendered. The total was far in excess of expectations and gave rise to a popular view Dunkirk had been a miracle, even a victory. Churchill himself referred to "a miracle of deliverance" in his "we shall fight on the beaches" speech to the Commons that afternoon. The speech ended on a note of defiance, with a clear appeal to the United States:

We shall go on to the end. We shall fight in France, we shall fight on the seas and oceans, we shall fight with growing confidence and growing strength in the air. We shall defend our island, whatever the cost may be. We shall fight on the beaches, we shall fight on the landing grounds, we shall fight in the fields and in the streets, we shall fight in the hills. We shall never surrender, and even if, which I do not for a moment believe, this island or a large part of it were subjugated and starving, then our Empire beyond the seas, armed and guarded by the British Fleet, would carry on the struggle, until, in God's good time, the New World, with all its power and might, steps forth to the rescue and the liberation of the Old.

Germany initiated Fall Rot, in France, the following day, and Italy entered the war on the 10th. The Wehrmacht occupied Paris on the 14th and completed their conquest of France on 25 June. It was now inevitable that Hitler would attack and probably try to invade Great Britain. Faced with this, Churchill addressed the Commons on 18 June with one of his most famous speeches, ending:

What General Weygand called the "Battle of France" is over. I expect that the Battle of Britain is about to begin. Hitler knows that he will have to break us in this island or lose the war. Let us therefore brace ourselves to our duty and so bear ourselves that if the British Commonwealth and Empire lasts for a thousand years, men will still say: "This was their finest hour".

Churchill ordered the commencement of the Western Desert campaign on 11 June, a response to the Italian declaration of war. This went well while Italy was the sole opposition, and Operation Compass was a success. In early 1941, however, Mussolini requested German support. Hitler sent the Afrika Korps to Tripoli under Erwin Rommel, who arrived not long after Churchill had halted Compass so he could reassign forces to Greece where the Balkans campaign was entering a critical phase.

In other initiatives through June and July 1940, Churchill ordered the formation of the Special Operations Executive (SOE) and Commandos. The SOE was ordered to promote and execute subversive activity in Nazi-occupied Europe, while the Commandos were charged with raids on military targets there. Hugh Dalton, the Minister of Economic Warfare, took political responsibility for the SOE and recorded that Churchill told him: "And now go and set Europe ablaze".

==== Battle of Britain and the Blitz ====
Churchill walks through the ruins of Coventry Cathedral, 1941

On 20 August 1940, at the height of the Battle of Britain, Churchill addressed the Commons and made a statement that created a famous nickname for the RAF fighter pilots involved in the battle:

The gratitude of every home in our Island, in our Empire, and indeed throughout the world, except in the abodes of the guilty, goes out to the British airmen who, undaunted by odds, unwearied in their constant challenge and mortal danger, are turning the tide of the World War by their prowess and by their devotion. Never in the field of human conflict was so much owed by so many to so few.

The Luftwaffe altered its strategy from 7 September 1940 and began the Blitz, which was intensive through October and November. Churchill's morale was high and told his private secretary John Colville, in November, he thought the threat of invasion was past. He was confident Great Britain could hold its own, given the increase in output, but was realistic about its chances of winning the war without American intervention.

==== Lend-Lease ====
In September 1940, the British and American governments concluded the destroyers-for-bases deal, by which 50 American destroyers were transferred to the Royal Navy in exchange for free US base rights in Bermuda, the Caribbean and Newfoundland. An added advantage for Britain was that its military assets in those bases could be redeployed elsewhere. Churchill's good relations with President Franklin D. Roosevelt helped secure vital food, oil and munitions via the North Atlantic shipping routes. It was for this reason that Churchill was relieved when Roosevelt was re-elected in 1940. Roosevelt set about implementing a new method of providing necessities to Great Britain, without the need for monetary payment. He persuaded Congress that repayment for this costly service would take the form of defending the US. The policy was known as Lend-Lease and was formally enacted on 11 March 1941.

==== Operation Barbarossa ====
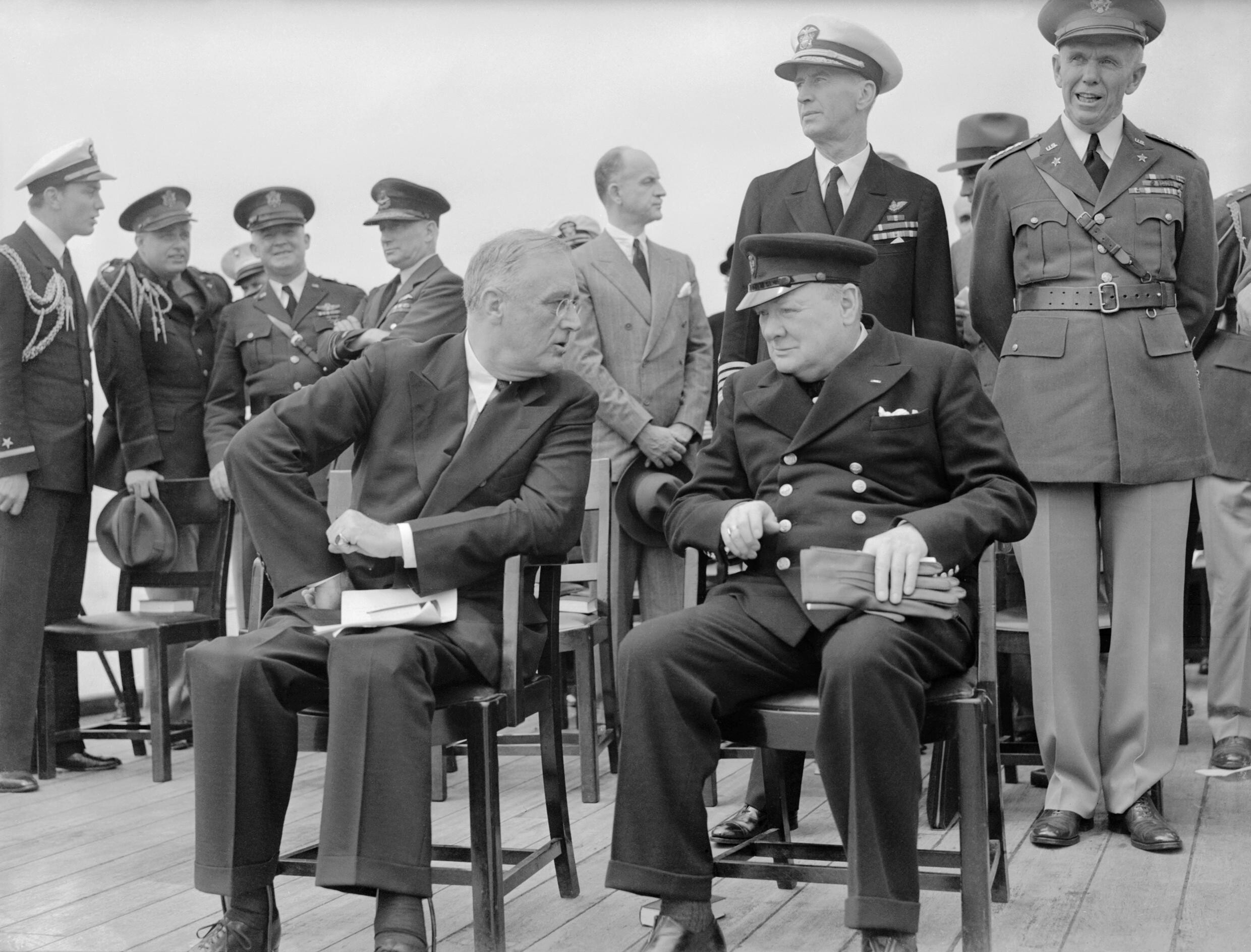
Churchill and Roosevelt seated on the quarterdeck of HMS Prince of Wales for a Sunday service during the Atlantic Conference, 10 August 1941

Hitler launched his invasion of the Soviet Union on 22 June 1941. Churchill had known since April, from Enigma decrypts at Bletchley Park, that the attack was imminent. He had tried to warn Joseph Stalin via the ambassador to Moscow, Stafford Cripps, but Stalin did not trust Churchill. The night before the attack, already intending to address the nation, Churchill alluded to his hitherto anti-communist views by saying to Colville: "If Hitler invaded Hell, I would at least make a favourable reference to the Devil".

==== Atlantic Charter ====
In August 1941, Churchill made his first transatlantic crossing of the war on board HMS Prince of Wales and met Roosevelt in Placentia Bay, Newfoundland. On 14 August, they issued the joint statement known as the Atlantic Charter. This outlined the goals of both countries for the future of the world and is seen as the inspiration for the 1942 Declaration by United Nations, itself the basis of the UN.

=== Pearl Harbor to D-Day: December 1941 to June 1944 ===
==== Pearl Harbor and United States entry into the war ====
In December 1941, the Japanese attack on Pearl Harbor was followed by their invasion of Malaya. On the 8th, Churchill declared war on Japan. With the hope of using Irish ports for counter-submarine operations, Churchill sent a telegram to Irish Prime Minister Éamon de Valera in which he obliquely offered Irish unity: "Now is your chance. Now or never! A nation once again! I will meet you wherever you wish." No meeting took place and there is no record of a response. Churchill went to Washington to meet Roosevelt for the Arcadia Conference. This was important for "Europe first", the decision to prioritise victory in Europe over victory in the Pacific, taken by Roosevelt while Churchill was still in the mid-Atlantic. The Americans agreed with Churchill that Hitler was the main enemy and defeat of Germany was key to Allied success. It was also agreed that the first joint Anglo-American strike would be Operation Torch, the invasion of French North Africa. Originally planned for spring 1942, it was launched in November 1942 when the crucial Second Battle of El Alamein was underway.

On 26 December, Churchill addressed a joint meeting of the United States Congress. Later that night, he suffered a heart attack, which was diagnosed by his physician, Charles Wilson, as a coronary deficiency requiring several weeks' bed rest. Churchill instead journeyed to Ottawa by train, where he gave a speech to the Canadian Parliament that included the "some chicken, some neck" line in which he recalled French predictions in 1940 that "Britain alone would have her neck wrung like a chicken". He arrived home mid-January, having flown from Bermuda to Plymouth in the first transatlantic air crossing by a head of government, to find there was a crisis of confidence in his government and him; he decided to face a vote of confidence in the Commons, which he won easily.

While he was away, the Eighth Army, having relieved the Siege of Tobruk, had pursued Operation Crusader against Rommel's forces in Libya, successfully driving them back to a defensive position at El Agheila. On 21 January 1942, however, Rommel launched a surprise counter-attack which drove the Allies back to Gazala. Elsewhere, British success in the Battle of the Atlantic was compromised by the Kriegsmarine's introduction of its M4 4-rotor Enigma, whose signals could not be deciphered by Bletchley Park for nearly a year. At a press conference in Washington, Churchill had to play down his increasing doubts about the security of Singapore.

==== Fall of Singapore and loss of Burma ====
Churchill already had grave concerns about the quality of British troops after the defeats in Norway, France, Greece and Crete. Following the fall of Singapore to the Japanese on 15 February 1942, he felt his misgivings were confirmed by "the worst disaster and largest capitulation in British military history". On 11 February the Kriegsmarine pulled off its audacious "Channel Dash", a massive blow to British naval prestige. The combined effect of these events was to sink Churchill's morale to its lowest point of the war.

==== Bengal Famine ====
Meanwhile, the Japanese had occupied most of Burma by the end of April 1942. Counter-offensives were hampered by the monsoon season and disordered conditions in Bengal and Bihar, as well as a severe cyclone which devastated the region in October 1942. A combination of factors, including the curtailment of essential rice imports from Burma, poor administration, wartime inflation and large-scale natural disasters such as flooding and crop disease led to the Bengal famine of 1943, in which an estimated 2.1–3.8 million people died.

From December 1942, food shortages had prompted senior officials to ask London for grain imports, although the colonial authorities failed to recognise the seriousness of the famine and responded ineptly. Churchill's government was criticised for refusing to approve more imports, a policy it ascribed to an acute shortage of shipping. When the British realised the full extent of the famine in September 1943, Churchill ordered the transportation of 130,000 tons of grain and the cabinet agreed to send 200,000 tons by the end of the year. During the last quarter of 1943, 100,000 tons of rice and 176,000 tons of wheat were imported, compared to averages of 55,000 and 54,000 tons respectively earlier in the year.

In October, Churchill wrote to the Viceroy of India, Lord Wavell, charging him with the responsibility of ending the famine. In February 1944, as preparation for Operation Overlord placed greater demands on Allied shipping, Churchill cabled Wavell: "I will certainly help you all I can, but you must not ask the impossible". Grain shipment requests continued to be turned down by the government throughout 1944, and Wavell complained to Churchill in October that "the vital problems of India are being treated by His Majesty's Government with neglect, even sometimes with hostility and contempt". The impact of British policies on the famine death toll remains controversial.

==== International conferences in 1942 ====
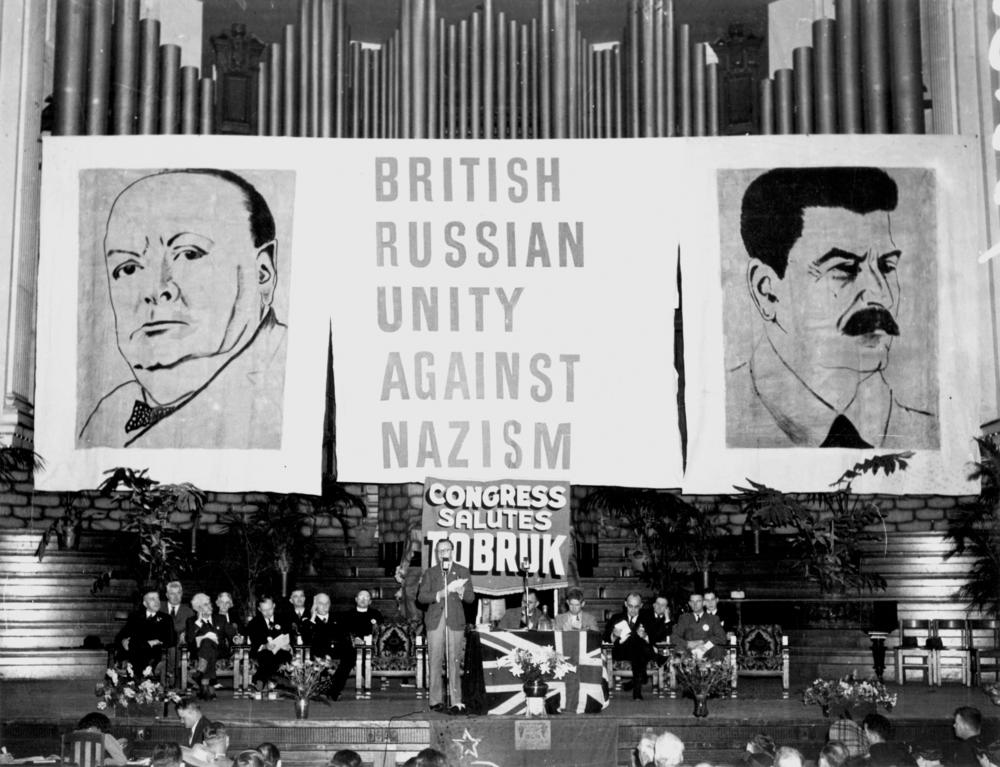
Huge portraits of Churchill and Stalin, Brisbane, Australia, 31 October 1941

On 20 May 1942, the Soviet Foreign minister, Vyacheslav Molotov, arrived in London to sign a treaty of friendship. Molotov wanted it done on the basis of territorial concessions regarding Poland and the Baltic countries. Churchill and Eden worked for a compromise and a twenty-year treaty was formalised, with the question of frontiers placed on hold. Molotov also sought a Second Front in Europe; Churchill confirmed preparations and made no promises on a date.

Churchill felt pleased with these negotiations. However, Rommel had launched his counter-offensive, Operation Venice, to begin the Battle of Gazala on 26 May. The Allies were driven out of Libya and defeated in the fall of Tobruk on 21 June. Churchill was with Roosevelt when the news reached him, and was shocked by the surrender of 35,000 troops which was, apart from Singapore, "the heaviest blow" he received in the war. The Axis advance was halted at the First Battle of El Alamein in July and the Battle of Alam el Halfa in September. Both sides were exhausted and in need of reinforcements and supplies.

Churchill returned to Washington on 17 June. He and Roosevelt agreed on the implementation of Operation Torch as the necessary precursor to an invasion of Europe. Roosevelt had appointed General Dwight D. Eisenhower as commanding officer of the European Theater of Operations, United States Army (ETOUSA). Having received the news from North Africa, Churchill obtained shipment from America to the Eighth Army of 300 Sherman tanks and 100 howitzers. He returned to Britain on 25 June and had to face another motion of no confidence, this time in his direction of the war, but again he won easily.

In August, despite health concerns, Churchill visited British forces in North Africa, raising morale, en route to Moscow for his first meeting with Stalin. He was accompanied by Roosevelt's special envoy Averell Harriman. He was in Moscow 12–16 August and had lengthy meetings with Stalin. Though they got along well personally, there was little chance of real progress given the state of the war. Stalin was desperate for the Allies to open the Second Front in Europe, as Churchill had discussed with Molotov in May, and the answer was the same.

==== El Alamein and Stalingrad ====
While he was in Cairo in August, Churchill appointed Field Marshal Alexander as Field Marshal Auchinleck's successor as Commander-in-Chief of the Middle East Theatre. Command of the Eighth Army was given to General William Gott but he was killed while flying to Cairo, and General Montgomery succeeded him.

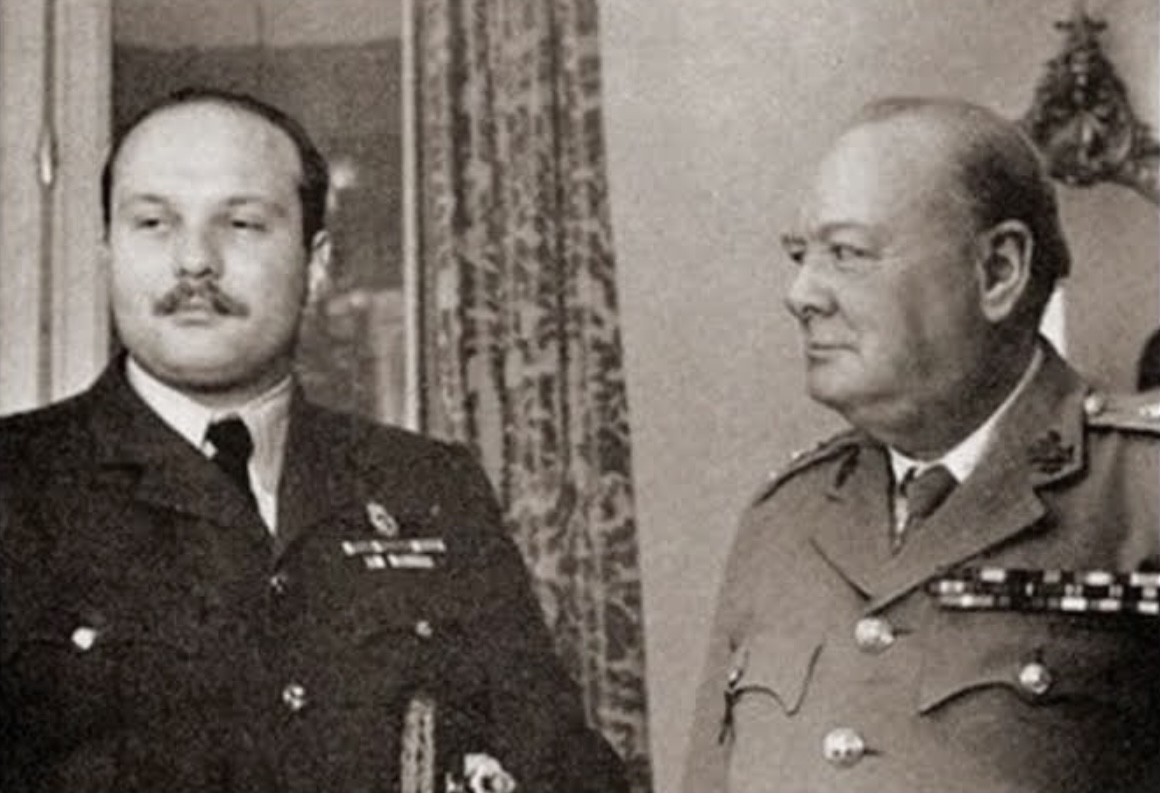
Churchill meeting King Farouk in Cairo in December 1942

As 1942 drew to a close, the tide of war began to turn with Allied victories in El Alamein, successful North Africa landings going on and Stalingrad. Until November, the Allies had been on the defensive, but afterwards, the Germans were. Churchill ordered church bells to be rung throughout Great Britain for the first time since 1940. On 10 November, knowing El Alamein was a victory and Operation Torch a success, he delivered one of his most memorable speeches: "This is not the end. It is not even the beginning of the end. But it is, perhaps, the end of the beginning".

==== International conferences in 1943 ====
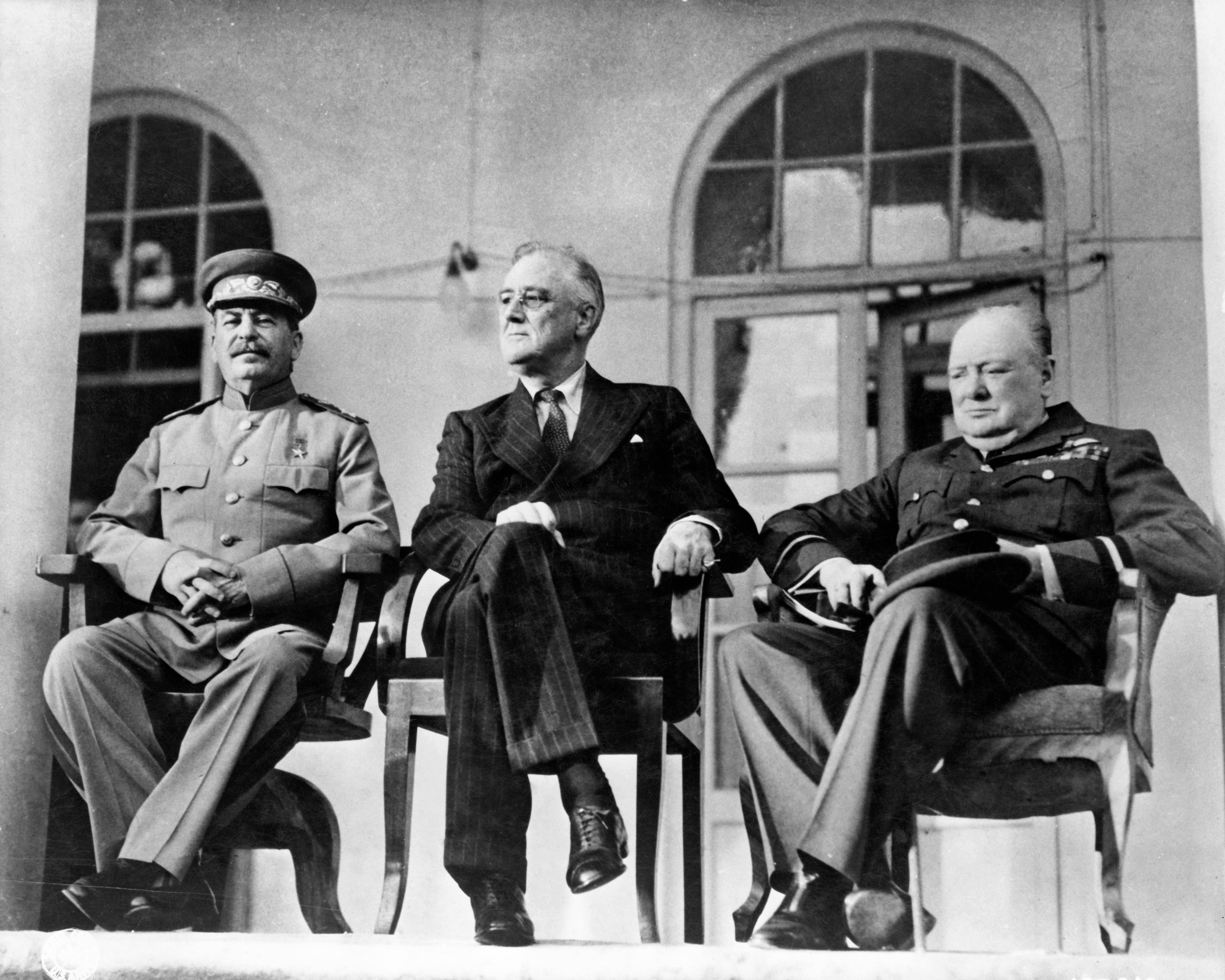
Stalin, Roosevelt and Churchill at the Tehran Conference in 1943

In January 1943, Churchill met Roosevelt at the Casablanca Conference. It was attended by General Charles de Gaulle from the Free French Forces. Stalin had hoped to attend but declined because of Stalingrad. Although Churchill expressed doubts on the matter, the so-called Casablanca Declaration committed the Allies to securing "unconditional surrender". From Morocco, Churchill went to Cairo, Adana, Cyprus, Cairo again and Algiers. He arrived home on 7 February having been out of the country for a month. He addressed the Commons on the 11th and became seriously ill with pneumonia the following day, necessitating more than a month of convalescence: he moved to Chequers. He returned to work in London on 15 March.

Churchill made two transatlantic crossings during the year, meeting Roosevelt at the third Washington Conference in May and the first Quebec Conference in August. In November, Churchill and Roosevelt met Chinese Generalissimo Chiang Kai-shek at the Cairo Conference. The most important conference of the year was 28 November to 1 December at Tehran, where Churchill and Roosevelt met Stalin in the first of the "Big Three" meetings. Roosevelt and Stalin co-operated in persuading Churchill to commit to the opening of a second front in western Europe and it was agreed Germany would be divided after the war, but no decisions were made about how. On their way back, Churchill and Roosevelt held a Second Cairo Conference with Turkish president İsmet İnönü, but İnönü did not commit to join the Allies.

Churchill went to Tunis, arriving on 10 December, initially as Eisenhower's guest (soon afterwards, Eisenhower took over as Supreme Allied Commander of the new SHAEF). Churchill became seriously ill with atrial fibrillation and was forced to remain in Tunis, until after Christmas while specialists were drafted in. Clementine and Colville arrived to keep him company; Colville had just returned to Downing Street after two years in the RAF. On 27 December, the party went on to Marrakesh for convalescence. Feeling much better, Churchill flew to Gibraltar on 14 January 1944 and sailed home on the King George V. He was back in London on 18 January and surprised MPs by attending Prime Minister's Questions in the Commons. Since 12 January 1943, when he set off for Casablanca, Churchill had been abroad or seriously ill for 203 of the 371 days.

==== Invasions of Sicily and Italy ====
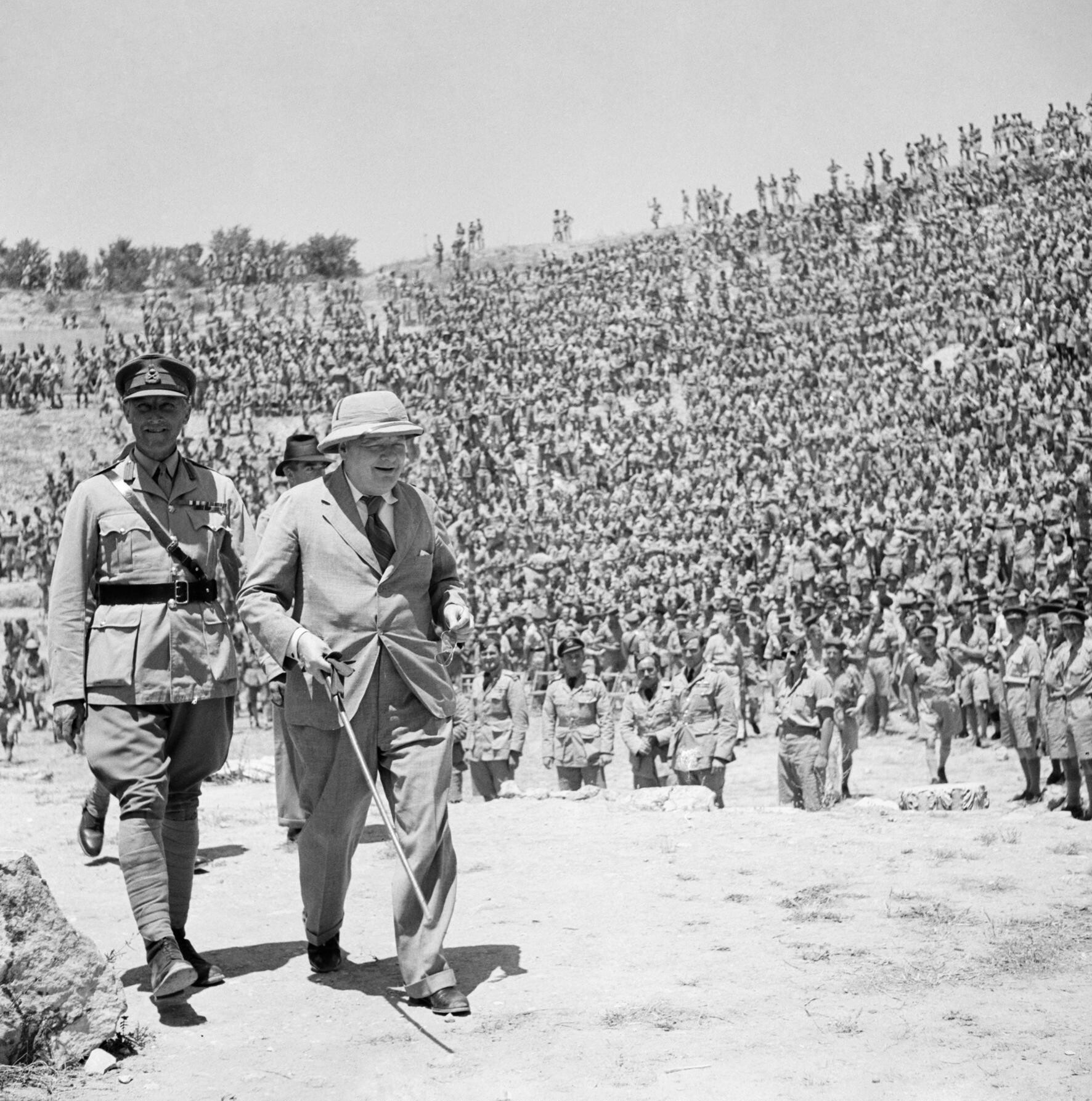
Churchill in the Carthage theatre, near the ancient Carthage Amphitheatre, to address 3,000 British and American troops, June 1943

In the autumn of 1942, after Churchill's meeting with Stalin, he was approached by Eisenhower, commanding the North African Theater of Operations, US Army (NATOUSA), and his aides on the subject of where the Western Allies should launch their first strike in Europe. According to General Mark W. Clark, the Americans admitted a cross-Channel operation in the near future was "utterly impossible". As an alternative, Churchill recommended "slit(ting) the soft belly of the Mediterranean" and persuaded them to invade Sicily and then mainland Italy, after they had defeated the Afrika Korps. After the war, Clark still agreed Churchill's analysis was correct, but added that, when the Allies landed at Salerno, they found Italy was "a tough old gut".

The invasion of Sicily began on 9 July and was completed by 17 August. Churchill was not keen on Overlord as he feared an Anglo-American army in France might not be a match for the fighting efficiency of the Wehrmacht. He preferred peripheral operations, including a plan called Operation Jupiter for an invasion of Norway. Events in Sicily had an unexpected impact in Italy. King Victor Emmanuel sacked Mussolini on 25 July and appointed Marshal Badoglio as prime minister. Badoglio opened negotiations with the Allies which resulted in the Armistice of Cassibile on 3 September. In response, the Germans activated Operation Achse and took control of most of Italy.

Although he still preferred Italy to Normandy as the Allies' main route into the Third Reich, Churchill was concerned about the strong German resistance at Salerno and, after the Allies successfully gained their bridgehead at Anzio but failed to break the stalemate, he caustically said that instead of "hurling a wildcat onto the shore", the Allied force had become a "stranded whale". The big obstacle was Monte Cassino and it was not until May 1944 when it was finally overcome, enabling the Allies to advance on Rome, which was taken on 4 June.

==== Preparations for D-Day ====
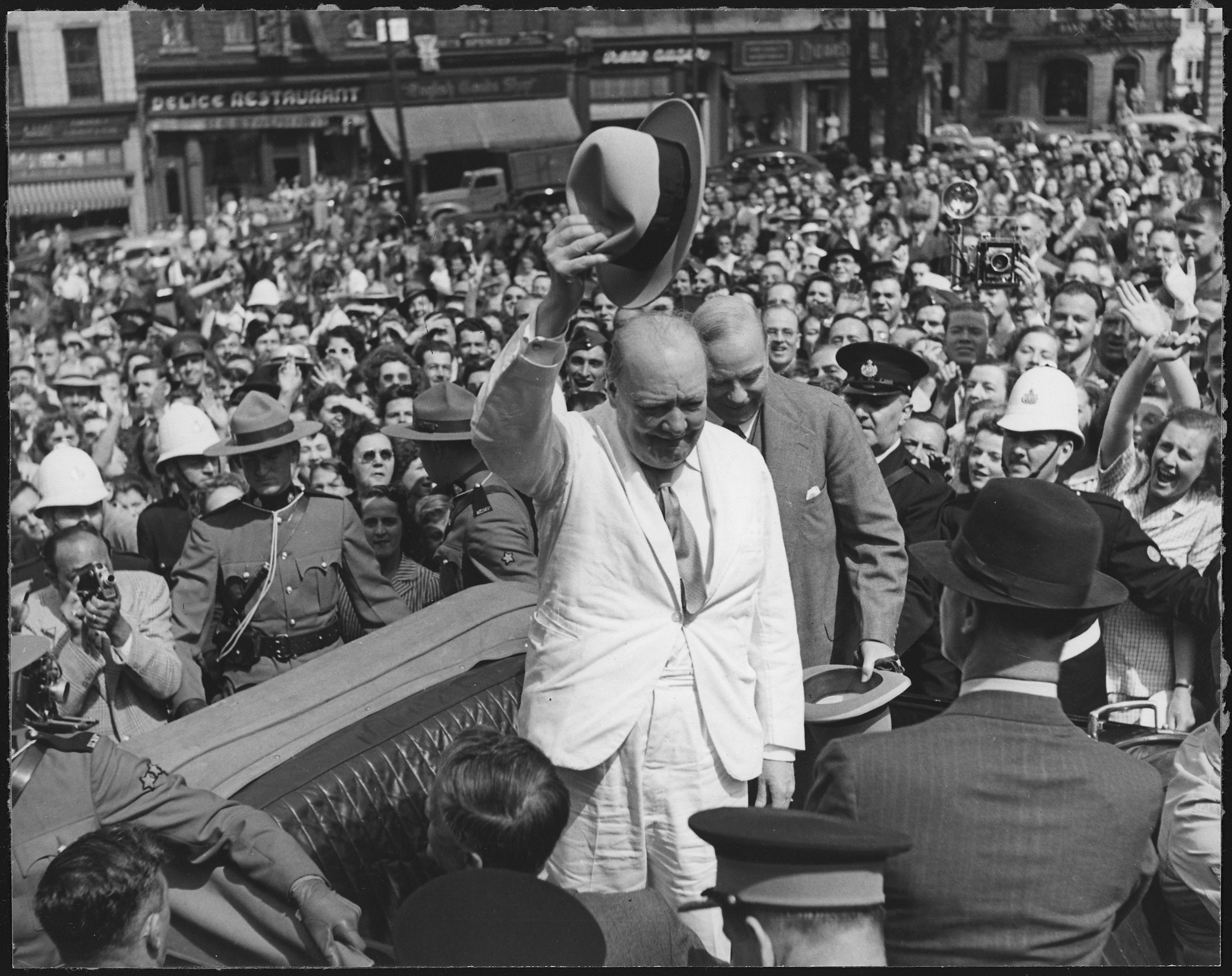
Churchill is greeted by a crowd in Québec City, Canada, 1943

The difficulties in Italy caused Churchill to change heart about strategy; when the Anzio stalemate developed after his return to England from North Africa, he threw himself into the planning of Overlord and set up meetings with SHAEF and the British Chiefs of Staff. These were attended by Eisenhower or his chief of staff General Walter Bedell Smith. Churchill was especially taken by the Mulberry harbours, but was keen to make the most of Allied airpower which, by 1944, had become overwhelming. Churchill never lost his apprehension about the invasion, and underwent mood fluctuation as D-Day approached. Jenkins says he faced potential victory with much less buoyancy than when he defiantly faced the prospect of defeat four years earlier.

==== Need for post-war reform ====
The Beveridge Report with its five "Giant Evils" was published in November 1942 and assumed great importance amid popular acclaim. Even so, Churchill spent most of his focus on the war, and saw post-war reform in terms of tidying up. His attitude was demonstrated in a radio broadcast on 26 March 1944. He was obliged to devote most of it to reform and showed a distinct lack of interest. Harold Nicolson said that, to many people, Churchill came across the air as "a worn and petulant old man". However, it was demand for reform that decided the 1945 general election. Attlee, Bevin and Labour's other coalition ministers were seen as working towards reform and earned the trust of the electorate.

=== Defeat of Germany: June 1944 to May 1945 ===
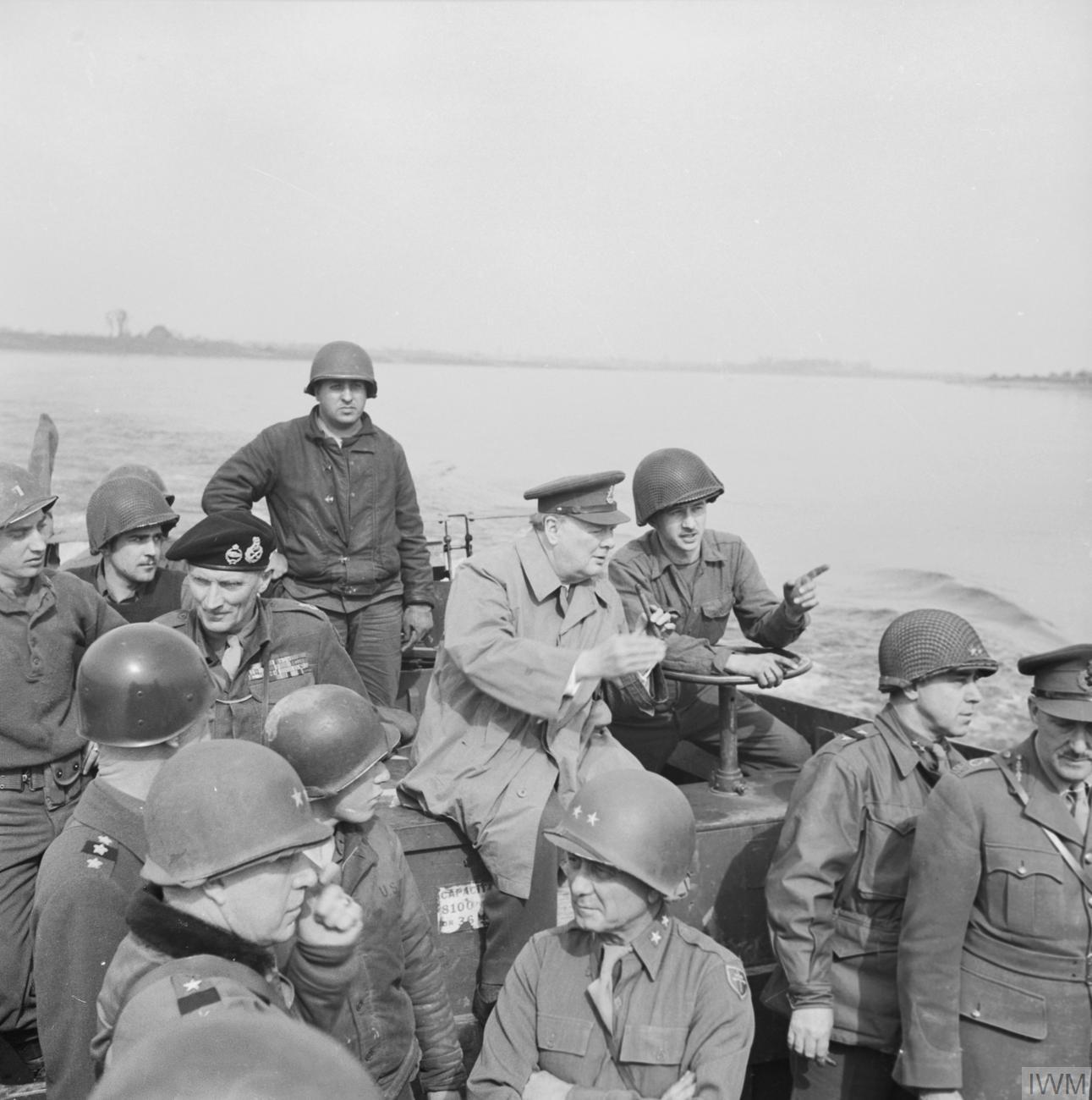
Churchill's crossing of the Rhine river in Germany, during Operation Plunder on 25 March 1945

==== D-Day: Allied invasion of Normandy ====
Churchill was determined to be actively involved in the Normandy invasion and hoped to cross the Channel on D-Day (6 June 1944) or at least D-Day+1. His desire caused unnecessary consternation at SHAEF, until he was effectively vetoed by the King. Churchill expected an Allied death toll of 20,000 on D-Day but fewer than 8,000 died in all of June. He made his first visit to Normandy on 12 June to visit Montgomery. That evening, as he was returning to London, the first V-1 flying bombs were launched. On 22–23 July, Churchill went to Cherbourg and Arromanches where he saw the Mulberry Harbour.

==== Quebec Conference, September 1944 ====
Churchill met Roosevelt at the Second Quebec Conference in September 1944. They reached agreement on the Morgenthau Plan for the Allied occupation of Germany, the intention of which was not only to demilitarise, but de-industrialise. Eden opposed it and persuaded Churchill to disown it. US Secretary of State Cordell Hull convinced Roosevelt it was infeasible.

==== Moscow Conference, October 1944 ====
At the fourth Moscow conference in October 1944, Churchill and Eden met Stalin and Molotov. This conference has gained notoriety for the so-called "Percentages agreement" in which Churchill and Stalin effectively agreed the post-war fate of the Balkans. By then, the Soviet armies were in Rumania and Bulgaria. Churchill suggested a scale of predominance throughout the whole region so as not to, as he put it, "get at cross-purposes in small ways". He wrote down some suggested percentages of influence per country and gave it to Stalin who ticked it. The agreement was that Russia would have 90% control of Romania and 75% control of Bulgaria. The United Kingdom and United States would have 90% control of Greece. Hungary and Yugoslavia would be 50% each. In 1958, five years after the account of this meeting was published (in The Second World War), Soviet authorities denied Stalin had accepted such an "imperialist proposal".

==== Yalta Conference, February 1945 ====
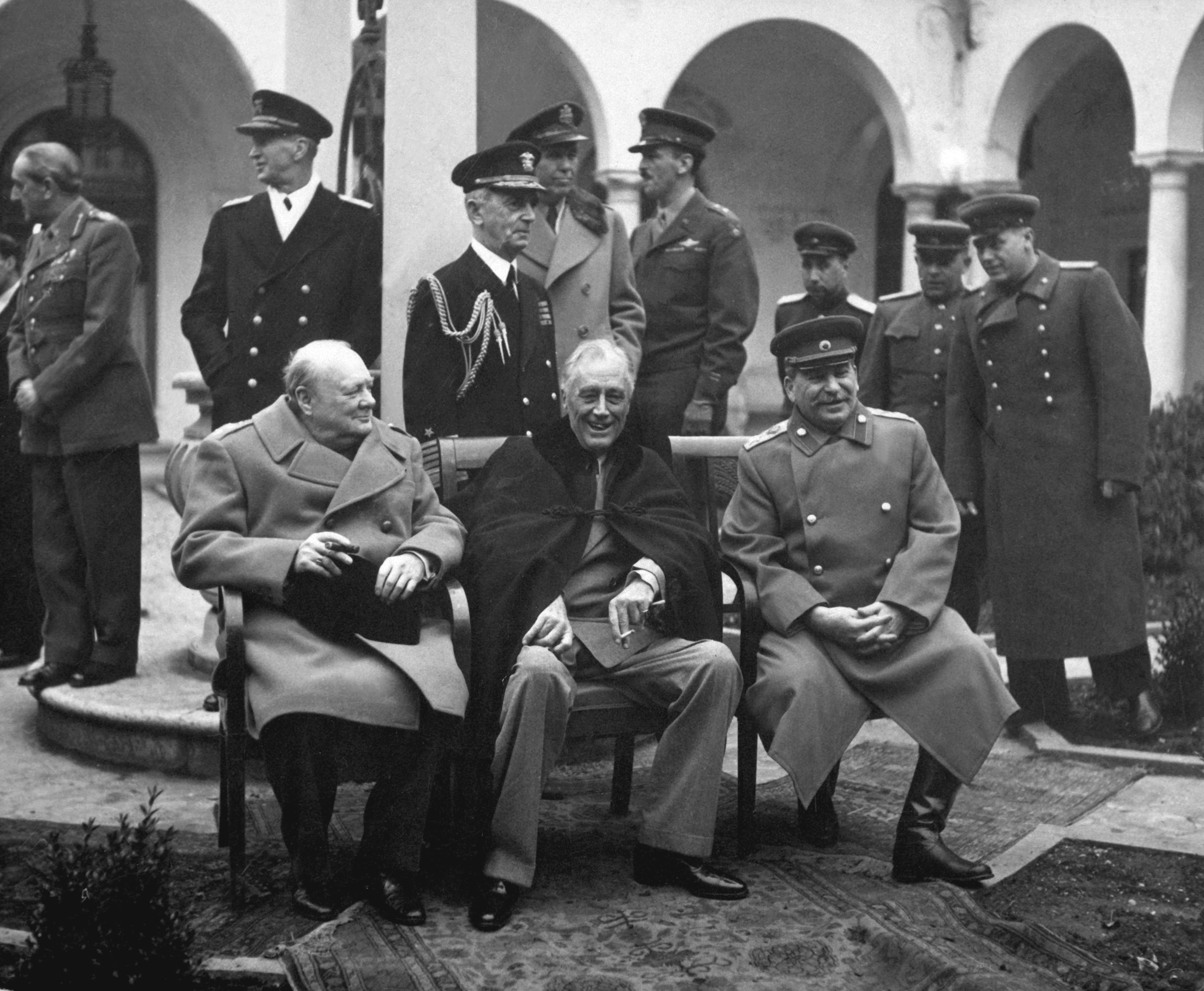
Churchill, Roosevelt, and Stalin at the Yalta Conference, February 1945

From 30 January to 2 February 1945, Churchill and Roosevelt met for their Malta Conference ahead of the second "Big Three" event at Yalta from 4 to 11 February. Yalta had massive implications for the post-war world. There were two predominant issues: the question of setting up the United Nations Organisation, on which much progress was made; and the more vexed question of Poland's post-war status, which Churchill saw as a test case for Eastern Europe. Churchill faced criticism for the agreement on Poland. For example, 27 Tory MPs voted against him when the matter was debated in the Commons at the end of the month. Jenkins, however, maintains that Churchill did as well as possible in difficult circumstances, not least the fact that Roosevelt was seriously ill and could not provide Churchill with meaningful support.

Another outcome of Yalta was the so-called Operation Keelhaul. The Western Allies agreed to the forcible repatriation of all Soviet citizens in the Allied zones, including prisoners of war, to the Soviet Union. The policy was later extended to all Eastern European refugees, many of whom were anti-communist. Keelhaul was implemented between August 1946 and May 1947.

==== Area bombing controversy ====
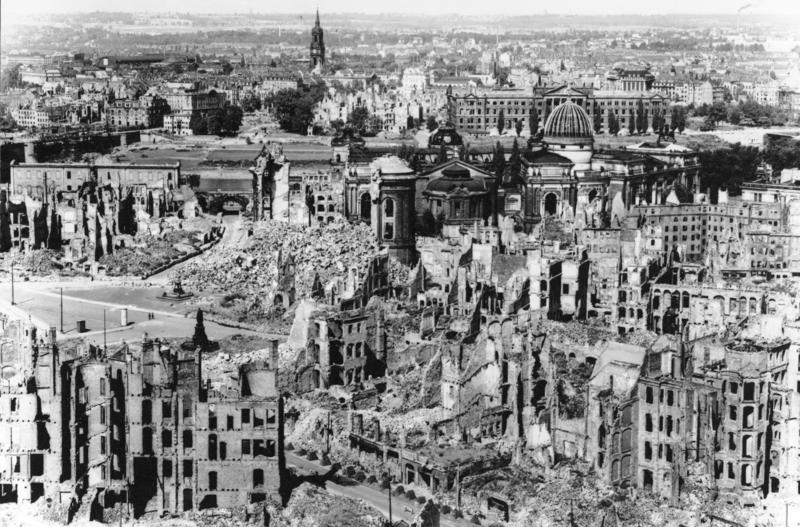
The destruction of Dresden, February 1945

On the nights of 13–15 February 1945, 1,200 British and US bombers attacked Dresden, which was crowded with wounded and refugees from the Eastern Front. The attacks were part of an area bombing campaign initiated by Churchill in January with the intention of shortening the war. Churchill came to regret the bombing because initial reports suggested an excessive number of civilian casualties close to the end of the war, though an independent commission in 2010 confirmed a death toll of about 24,000. On 28 March, he decided to restrict area bombing and sent a memo to General Ismay for the Chiefs of Staff Committee:

The destruction of Dresden remains a serious query against the conduct of Allied bombing.... I feel the need for more precise concentration upon military objectives.... rather than on mere acts of terror and wanton destruction, however impressive.

Historian Frederick Taylor has pointed out that the number of Soviets who died from German bombing was roughly equivalent to the number of Germans who died from Allied raids. Jenkins asks if Churchill was moved more by foreboding than by regret, but admits it is easy to criticise with the hindsight of victory. He adds that the area bombing campaign was no more reprehensible than President Truman's use of the second atomic bomb on Nagasaki. Andrew Marr, quoting Max Hastings, says that Churchill's memo was a "calculated political attempt...to distance himself...from the rising controversy surrounding the area offensive".

==== VE Day (Victory in Europe Day) ====
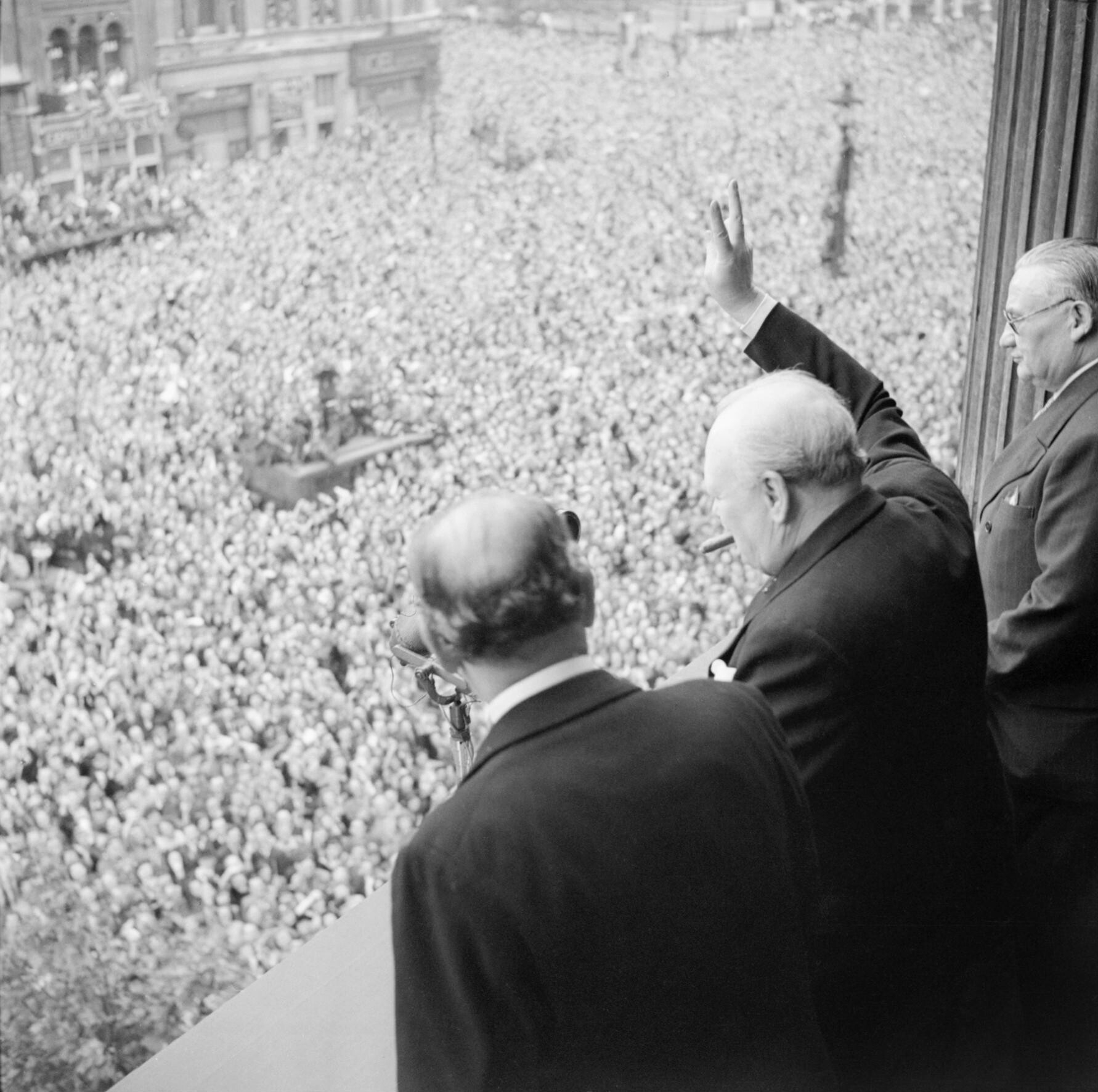
Churchill waving the Victory sign to the crowd in Whitehall on the day he broadcast to the nation that the war with Germany had been won, 8 May 1945.

On 7 May 1945 the Allies accepted Germany's surrender. The next day was Victory in Europe Day (VE Day) when Churchill broadcast to the nation that Germany had surrendered. Churchill appeared on the balcony at Buckingham Palace with the Royal Family before a huge crowd of celebrating citizens. He went from the palace to Whitehall where he addressed another large crowd: "God bless you all. This is your victory. In our long history, we have never seen a greater day than this. Everyone, man or woman, has done their best".

He asked Bevin to come forward and share the applause. Bevin said: "No, Winston, this is your day", and proceeded to conduct the people in the singing of "For He's a Jolly Good Fellow". In the evening, Churchill made another broadcast correctly asserting that the defeat of Japan would follow in the coming months.

Later in the month France attempted to put down a nationalist uprising in Syria. Churchill intervened and on 31 May gave de Gaulle an ultimatum to desist, but this was ignored. In what became known as the Levant Crisis, British forces from Transjordan were mobilised to restore order. The French, outnumbered, had no option but to return to their bases. De Gaulle felt humiliated, and a diplomatic row broke out – Churchill reportedly told a colleague that de Gaulle was "a great danger to peace and for Great Britain".

==== Operation Unthinkable ====
In May 1945, Winston Churchill commissioned the Chiefs of Staff Committee to provide its thoughts on a possible military campaign against the USSR, code-named Operation Unthinkable. One plan involved a surprise attack on Soviet troops stationed in Germany to impose "the will of the United States and the British Empire" on the Soviets. The hypothetical start date for the Allied invasion of Soviet-held Europe was set for 1 July 1945.

=== Caretaker government: May 1945 to July 1945 ===
With a general election looming, and with Labour ministers refusing to continue the coalition, Churchill resigned as prime minister on 23 May 1945. Later that day, he accepted the King's invitation to form a new government, known officially as the National Government but sometimes called the caretaker ministry. It contained Conservatives, National Liberals and a few non-party figures such as Sir John Anderson and Lord Woolton, but not Labour or Archibald Sinclair's Official Liberals. Churchill was formally reappointed on 28 May.

==== Potsdam Conference ====
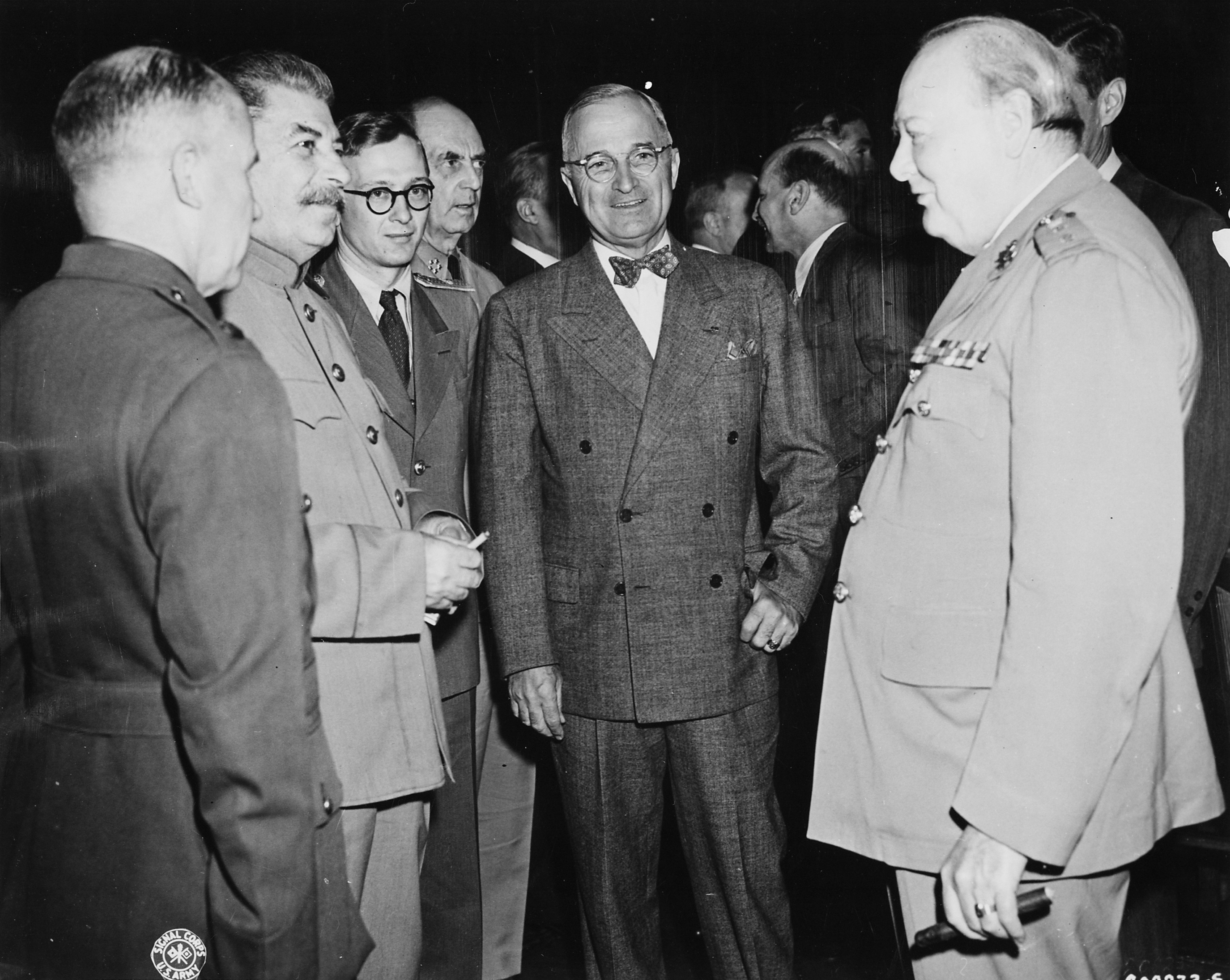
Churchill, Harry S. Truman, and Stalin at the Potsdam Conference, July 1945

Churchill was Great Britain's representative at the Potsdam Conference when it opened on 17 July and was accompanied at its sessions by Eden and Attlee. They attended nine sessions in nine days before returning to England for their election counts. After the landslide Labour victory, Attlee returned with Bevin as the new Foreign Secretary for five days of discussion. Potsdam went badly for Churchill. Eden later described his performance as "appalling", saying he was unprepared and verbose. Churchill upset the Chinese, exasperated the Americans and was easily led by Stalin, whom he was supposed to be resisting.

==== General election, July 1945 ====
Churchill mishandled the election campaign by resorting to party politics and trying to denigrate Labour. On 4 June, he committed a serious gaffe by saying in a radio broadcast that a Labour government would require "some form of Gestapo" to enforce its agenda. It backfired and Attlee made political capital by saying in his reply broadcast next day: "The voice we heard last night was that of Mr Churchill, but the mind was that of Lord Beaverbrook". Jenkins says that this broadcast was "the making of Attlee"—it had a significant bearing on the election result.

Although polling day was 5 July, the results did not become known until 26 July, owing to the need to collect votes of those serving overseas. Clementine and daughter Mary had been at the count in Woodford, Churchill's new constituency, and had returned to Downing Street to meet him for lunch. Churchill was unopposed by the major parties in Woodford, but his majority over a sole independent candidate was much less than expected. He anticipated defeat by Labour and Mary later described the lunch as "an occasion of Stygian gloom". To Clementine's suggestion that defeat might be "a blessing in disguise", Churchill retorted: "At the moment it seems very effectively disguised".

That afternoon Churchill's doctor Lord Moran commiserated with him on the "ingratitude" of the public, to which Churchill replied: "I wouldn't call it that. They have had a very hard time". Having lost, despite enjoying personal support amongst the population, he resigned as prime minister and was succeeded by Attlee who formed the first majority Labour government. Many reasons have been given for Churchill's defeat, key being a widespread desire for reform and that the man who had led Britain in war was not seen as the man to lead in peace. Although the Conservative Party was unpopular, many electors appear to have wanted Churchill to continue as prime minister whatever the outcome, or to have wrongly believed this would be possible.

== Leader of the Opposition: 1945–1951 ==
=== "Iron Curtain" speech ===
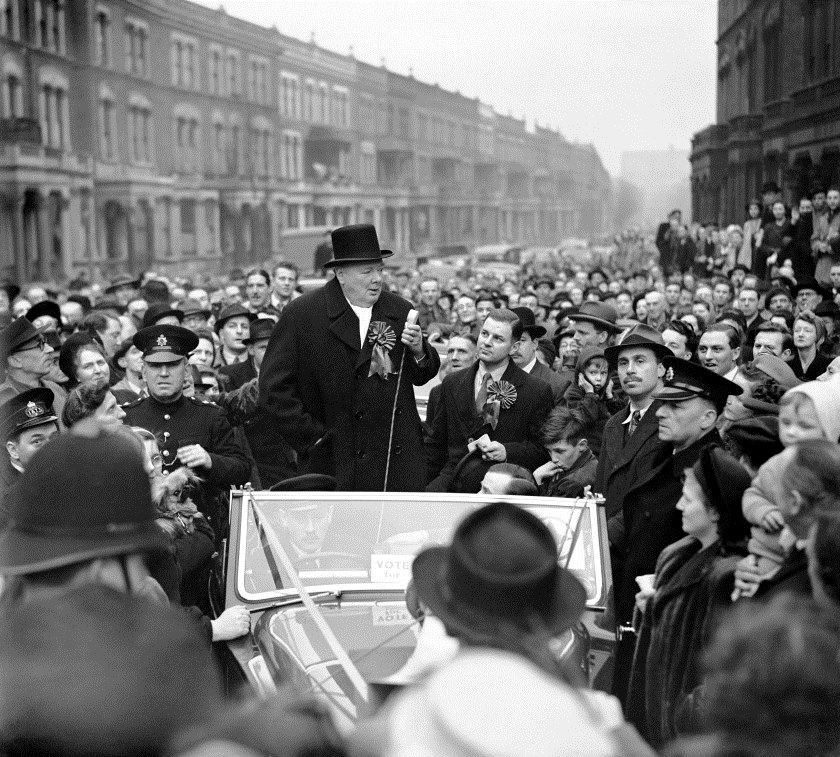
Churchill in 1949

Churchill continued to lead the Conservative Party and served as Leader of the Opposition. In 1946, he was in America from early January to late March. It was on this trip he gave his "Iron Curtain" speech about the USSR and its creation of the Eastern Bloc. His view was that, though the Soviet Union did not want war with the western Allies, its entrenched position in Eastern Europe had made it impossible for the three great powers to provide the world with a "triangular leadership". Within the same speech, he called for "a special relationship between the British Commonwealth and Empire and the United States", but emphasised the need for co-operation within the framework of the United Nations Charter.

Churchill was an early proponent of pan-Europeanism, having called for a "United States of Europe" in a 1930 article. He supported the creations of the Council of Europe in 1949 and the European Coal and Steel Community in 1951, but his support was initially with the firm proviso that Britain must not join any federal grouping. But as the first steps to European unity were taken, and as the new realities of Britain's shrunken role in the world sank in, Churchill advocated the creation of a united Europe that would include Britain. He lent his considerable personal prestige to the Congress of Europe in 1948 in The Hague, where he called for the 16 democratic European countries, "including Great Britain, linked with her Empire and Commonwealth", to start building Europe, aiming at "the union of Europe as a whole". In 1961, when Harold Macmillan applied to join the European Economic Community (EEC), Churchill wrote to his Conservative Association in support.

Labour won the 1950 general election, but with a much-reduced majority. A fresh election was called the following year and the Conservatives won a majority.

== Prime Minister: 1951–1955 ==
=== Election result and cabinet appointments ===
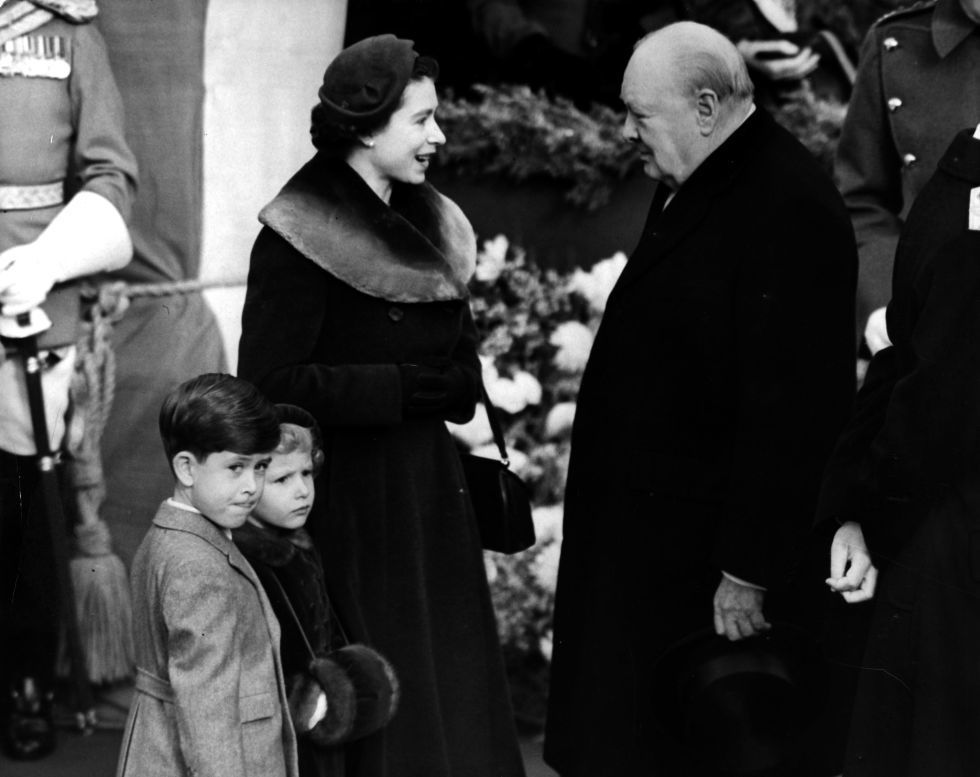
Churchill with Queen Elizabeth II, Prince Charles and Princess Anne, 10 February 1953

Despite losing the popular vote, the Conservatives won a majority of 17 seats in the October 1951 general election and Churchill became prime minister, remaining in office until his resignation on 5 April 1955. Eden was restored to Foreign Affairs. Future prime minister Harold Macmillan was appointed Minister of Housing and Local Government with a manifesto commitment to build 300,000 new houses per year, Churchill's only real domestic concern. He achieved the target and, in 1954, was promoted to Minister of Defence.

=== Health issues to eventual resignation ===
Churchill was nearly 77 when he took office and not in good health following minor strokes. By December 1951, George VI had become concerned about Churchill's decline and intended asking him to stand down in favour of Eden, but the King had his own health issues and died on 6 February 1952. Churchill developed a friendship with Elizabeth II and, in spring 1953, accepted the Order of the Garter at her request. He was knighted on 24 April 1953. It was widely expected he would retire after the Queen's Coronation in 1953 but, after Eden became seriously ill, Churchill increased his own responsibilities by taking over at the Foreign Office. On 23 June 1953, Churchill suffered a serious stroke; the matter was kept secret and Churchill went to Chartwell to recuperate. He had recovered by November. He retired in April 1955 and was succeeded by Eden.

=== Foreign affairs ===
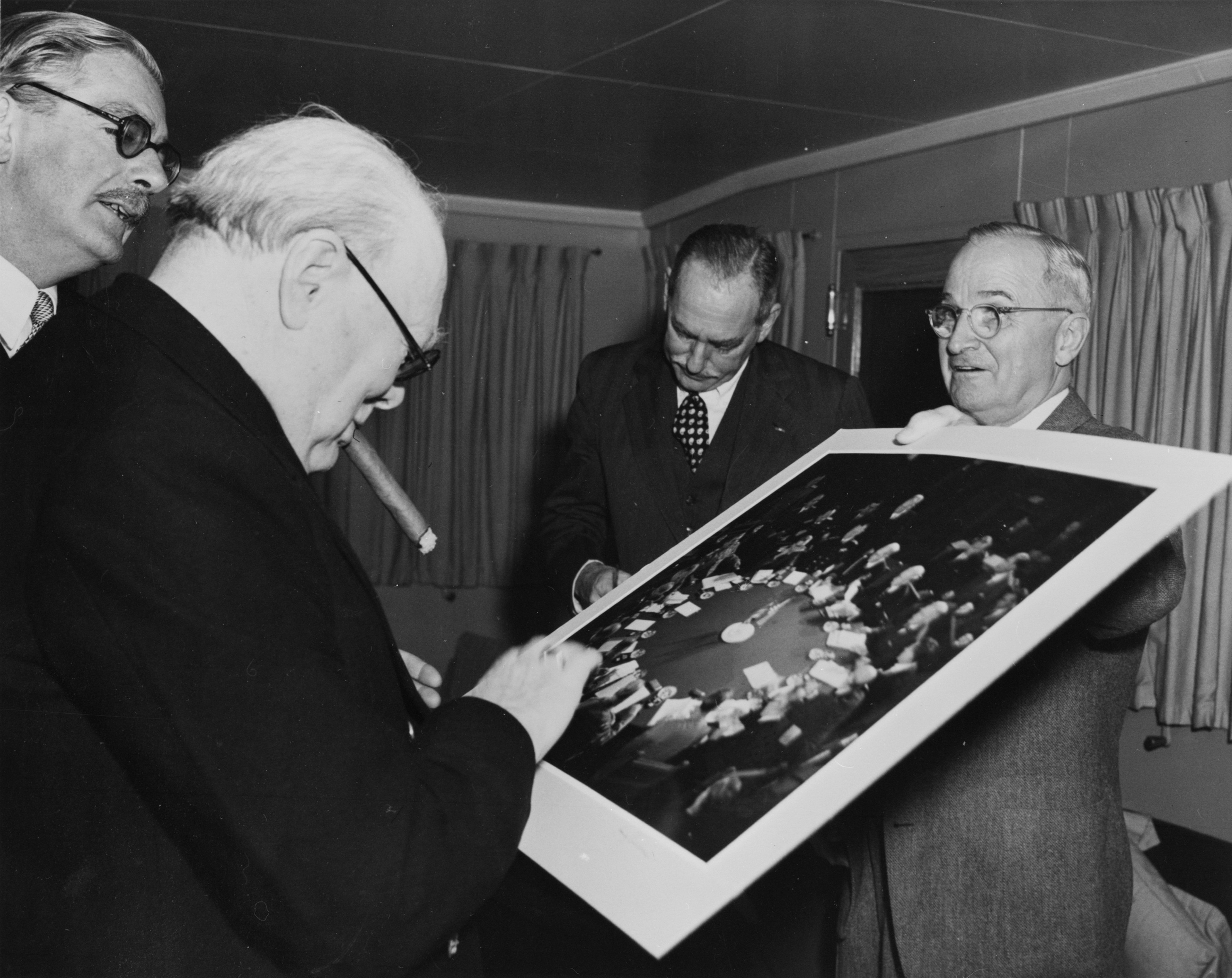
Churchill with Anthony Eden, Dean Acheson and Harry Truman, 5 January 1952

Churchill feared a global conflagration and believed the only way to preserve peace and freedom was co-operation between Britain and America. He made four official transatlantic visits from January 1952 to July 1954. He enjoyed a good relationship with Truman, but difficulties arose over the planned European Defence Community (EDC), by which Truman hoped to reduce America's military presence in West Germany. Churchill wanted US military support of British interests in Egypt and the Middle East, but while Truman expected British military involvement in Korea, he viewed any US commitment to the Middle East as maintaining British imperialism. The Americans recognised the British Empire was in terminal decline and had welcomed the Attlee government's policy of decolonisation. Churchill believed Britain's position as a world power depended on the empire's continued existence.

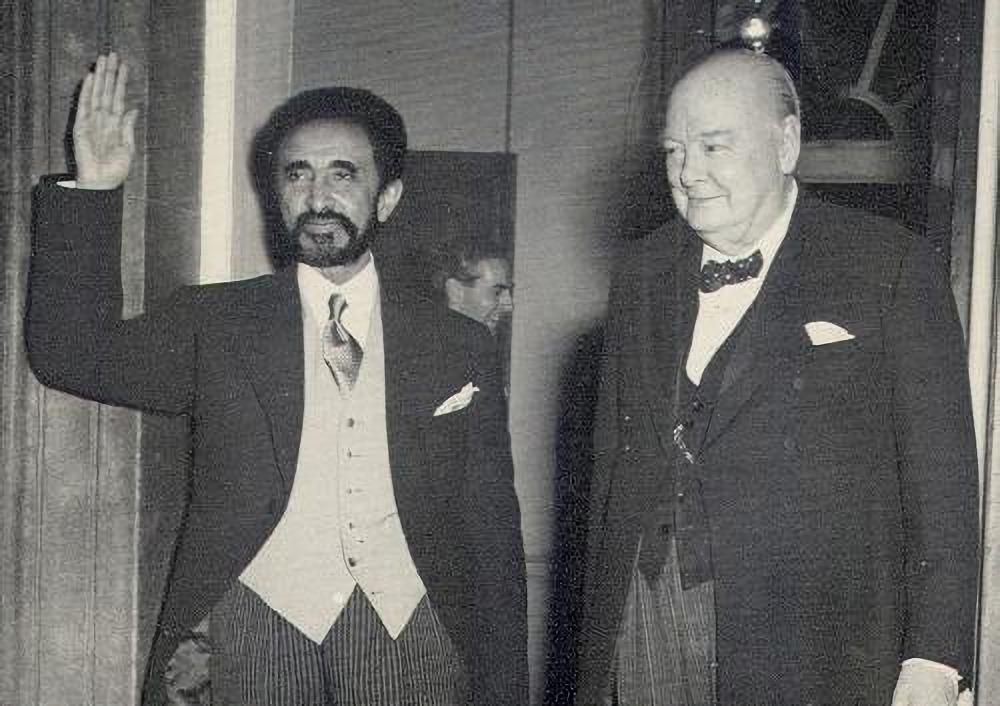
Churchill meeting Ethiopian Emperor Haile Selassie, 22 October 1954, one of the UK's African allies in World War II

Churchill had been obliged to recognise Colonel Nasser's revolutionary government of Egypt, which took power in 1952. Much to Churchill's dismay, agreement was reached in October 1954 on the phased evacuation of British troops from their Suez base. Britain agreed to terminate its rule in Anglo-Egyptian Sudan by 1956, though this was in return for Nasser's abandonment of Egyptian claims over the region. Elsewhere, the Malayan Emergency, a guerrilla war fought by Communist fighters against Commonwealth forces, had begun in 1948 and continued until 1960. Churchill's government maintained the military response to the crisis and adopted a similar strategy for the Mau Mau Uprising in British Kenya (1952–1960).

Churchill was uneasy about the election of Eisenhower as Truman's successor. After Stalin died in March 1953, Churchill sought a summit meeting with the Soviets, but Eisenhower refused out of fear the Soviets would use it for propaganda. Churchill believed Eisenhower did not fully comprehend the danger posed by the H-bomb and he greatly distrusted Eisenhower's Secretary of State, John Foster Dulles. Churchill hosted Eisenhower at the Three-Powers Bermuda Conference, with French Prime Minister Joseph Laniel, in December; they met again in June/July 1954 at the White House. In the end, the Soviets proposed a four-power summit, but it did not meet until July 1955, three months after Churchill's retirement.

== Later life: 1955–1965 ==
=== Retirement: 1955–1964 ===
Elizabeth II offered to create Churchill Duke of London, but he declined because of the objections of Randolph, who would have inherited the title. Although publicly supportive, Churchill was privately scathing about Eden's handling of the Suez Crisis and Clementine believed that many of his visits to the US in the following years were attempts to repair Anglo-American relations.

By the time of the 1959 general election, he seldom attended the House of Commons. He stood down at the 1964 general election. He spent most of his retirement at Chartwell or at his London home in Hyde Park Gate, and became an habitué of high society at La Pausa on the French Riviera. In June 1962, aged 87, Churchill broke his hip from falling in Monte Carlo. He was flown to a London hospital where he remained for three weeks. Jenkins says Churchill was never the same after this. In 1963, US President John F. Kennedy, under authorisation of an Act of Congress, proclaimed him an honorary citizen of the United States, but he was unable to attend the White House ceremony. There has been speculation he became very depressed in his final years, but this was emphatically denied by his secretary Anthony Montague Browne, who was with him for his last 10 years.

=== Death, funeral and memorials ===
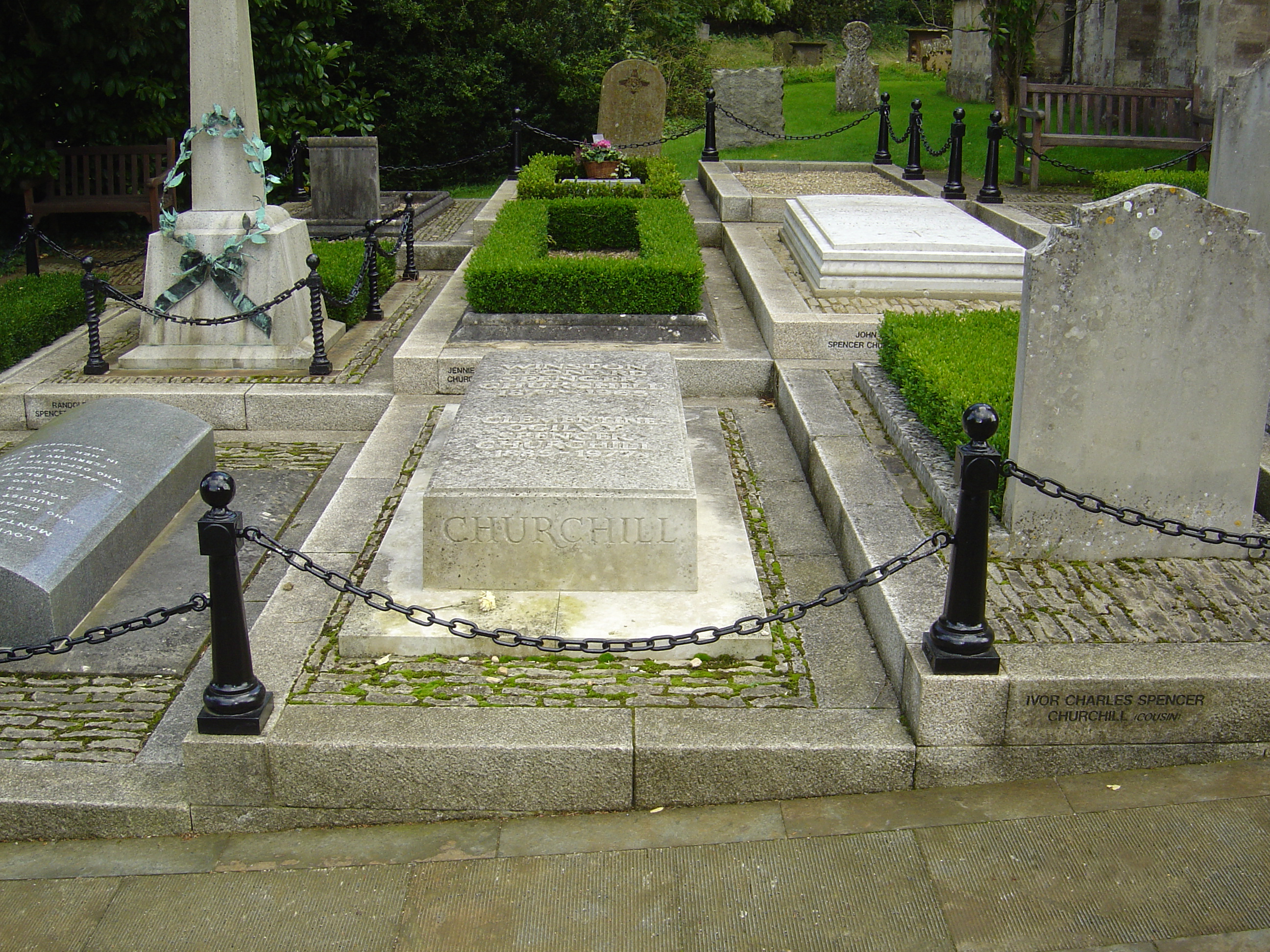
Churchill's grave at St Martin's Church, Bladon

Churchill suffered his final stroke on 10 January 1965 and died at his London home, 28 Hyde Park Gate, on 24 January. Churchill was given a state funeral. His coffin lay in state at Westminster Hall for three days. The funeral ceremony was at St Paul's Cathedral on 30 January. Afterwards, the coffin was taken by boat along the River Thames to Waterloo Station and from there by a special train to the family plot at St Martin's Church, Bladon.

Worldwide, numerous memorials have been dedicated to Churchill. His statue in Parliament Square was unveiled by his widow Clementine in 1973. The Cabinet War Rooms have been renamed the Churchill War Rooms. Churchill College, Cambridge, was established as a national memorial to Churchill. In a 2002 BBC poll that attracted 447,423 votes, he was voted the greatest-ever Briton.

Churchill was the first of only eight people to be granted honorary citizenship of the United States. The United States Navy named a Arleigh Burke-class destroyer as the USS Winston S. Churchill in 1999. Other memorials in North America include the National Churchill Museum in Fulton, where he made the 1946 "Iron Curtain" speech; Churchill Square in Edmonton, Alberta; and the Winston Churchill Range, a mountain range northwest of Lake Louise, also in Alberta.

== Artist, historian, and writer ==
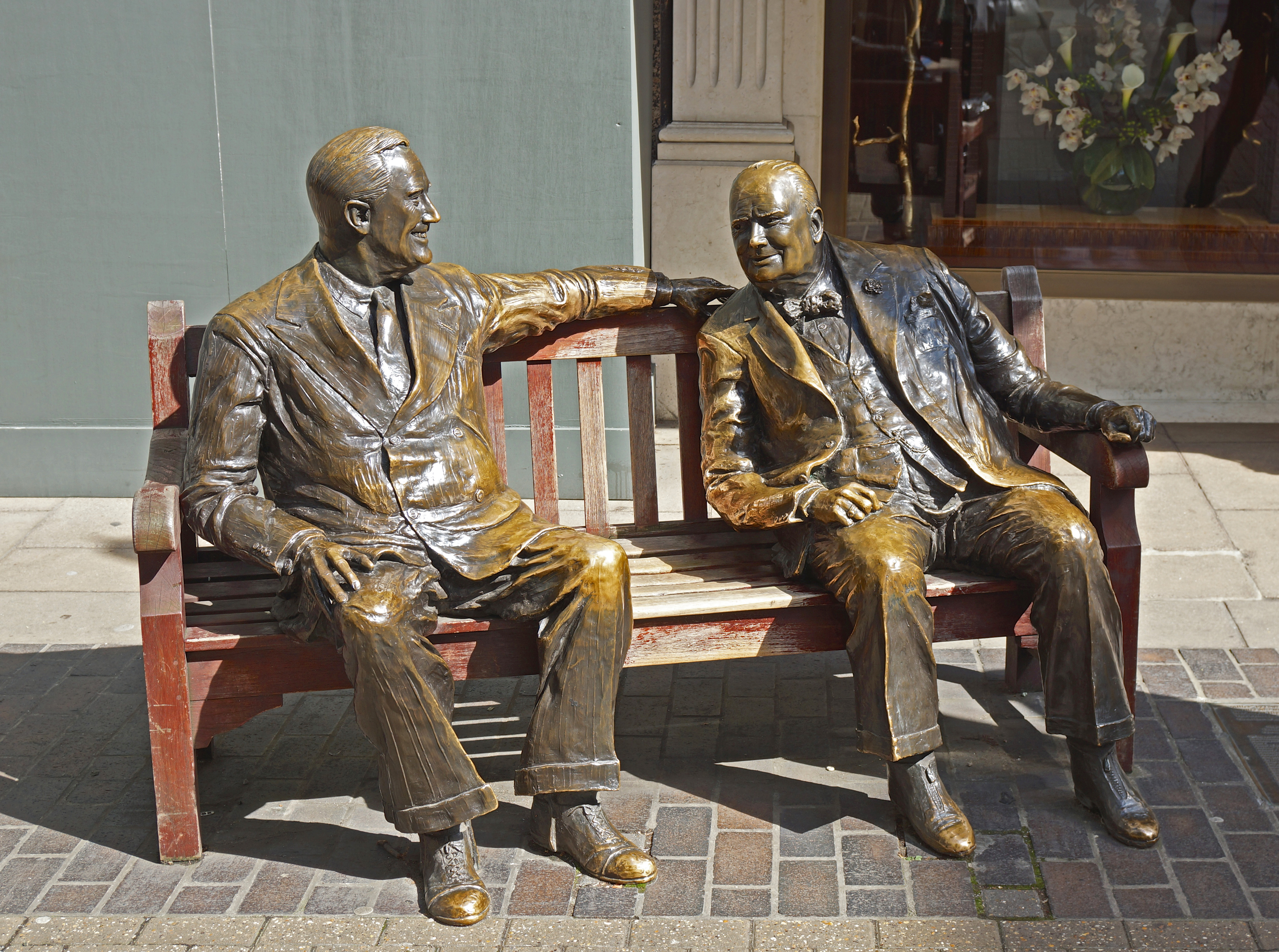
Allies (1995) by Lawrence Holofcener, a sculptural group depicting Franklin D. Roosevelt and Churchill in Bond Street, London

Churchill was a prolific writer. His output included a novel (Savrola), two biographies, memoirs, histories, and press articles. Two of his most famous works were his six-volume memoir, The Second World War, and the four-volume A History of the English-Speaking Peoples. Churchill received the Nobel Prize in Literature in 1953.

He used either "Winston S. Churchill" or "Winston Spencer Churchill" as his pen name to avoid confusion with the American novelist Winston Churchill, with whom he had a friendly correspondence. For many years, he relied on his press articles to assuage his financial worries.

Churchill became an accomplished amateur artist beginning after his resignation from the Admiralty in 1915. Often using the pseudonym "Charles Morin", identical to that of the French landscape painter Charles Camille Morin (died 1919), he completed hundreds of paintings, many of which are on show in Chartwell and in private collections.

Churchill was an amateur bricklayer, constructing buildings and garden walls at Chartwell. He joined the Amalgamated Union of Building Trade Workers, but was expelled after he rejoined the Conservative Party. He bred butterflies. He was known for his love of animals and always had several pets, mainly cats but also dogs, pigs, lambs, bantams, goats and fox cubs among others.

== Legacy and assessments ==
=== Political ideology ===
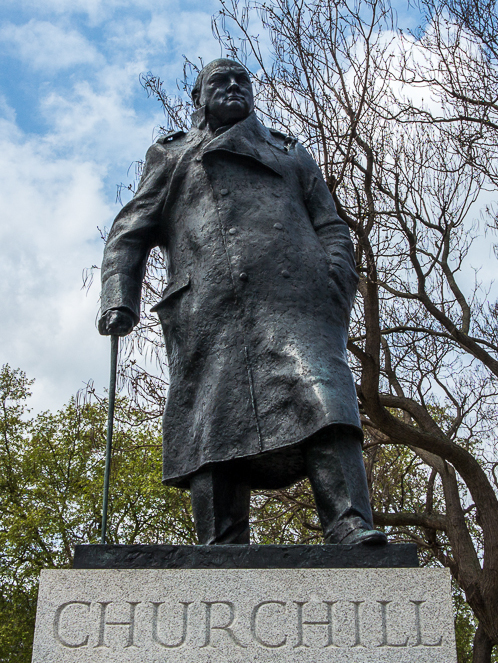
The statue of Churchill (1973) by Ivor Roberts-Jones in Parliament Square, London

As a politician, Churchill was perceived by some to have been largely motivated by personal ambition rather than political principle. During his early career, he was often provocative and argumentative to an unusual degree; and his barbed rhetorical style earned him enemies in parliament. Others deemed him to be an honest politician who displayed particular loyalty to his family and close friends. Robert Rhodes James said he "lacked any capacity for intrigue and was refreshingly innocent and straightforward".

Until the outbreak of the Second World War, Churchill's approach to politics generated widespread "mistrust and dislike", largely on account of his two party defections. His biographers have variously categorised him, in terms of political ideology, as "fundamentally conservative", "(always) liberal in outlook", and "never circumscribed by party affiliation". He was nearly always opposed to socialism because of its propensity for state planning and his belief in free markets. The exception was during his wartime coalition when he was reliant upon the support of his Labour colleagues. Churchill had long been regarded as an enemy of the working class, and his response to the Rhondda Valley unrest and his anti-socialist rhetoric brought condemnation from socialists who saw him as a reactionary. His role in opposing the General Strike earned the enmity of strikers and most members of the Labour movement. Paradoxically, Churchill was supportive of trade unionism, which he saw as the "antithesis of socialism".

On the other hand, he was in many respects a radical and reformer, but always with the intention of preserving the existing social structure, displaying what Addison calls the attitude of a "benevolent paternalist". Jenkins remarked that Churchill had "a substantial record as a social reformer" in his ministerial career. Similarly, Rhodes James thought that Churchill's achievements were "considerable".

=== Imperialism and racial views ===
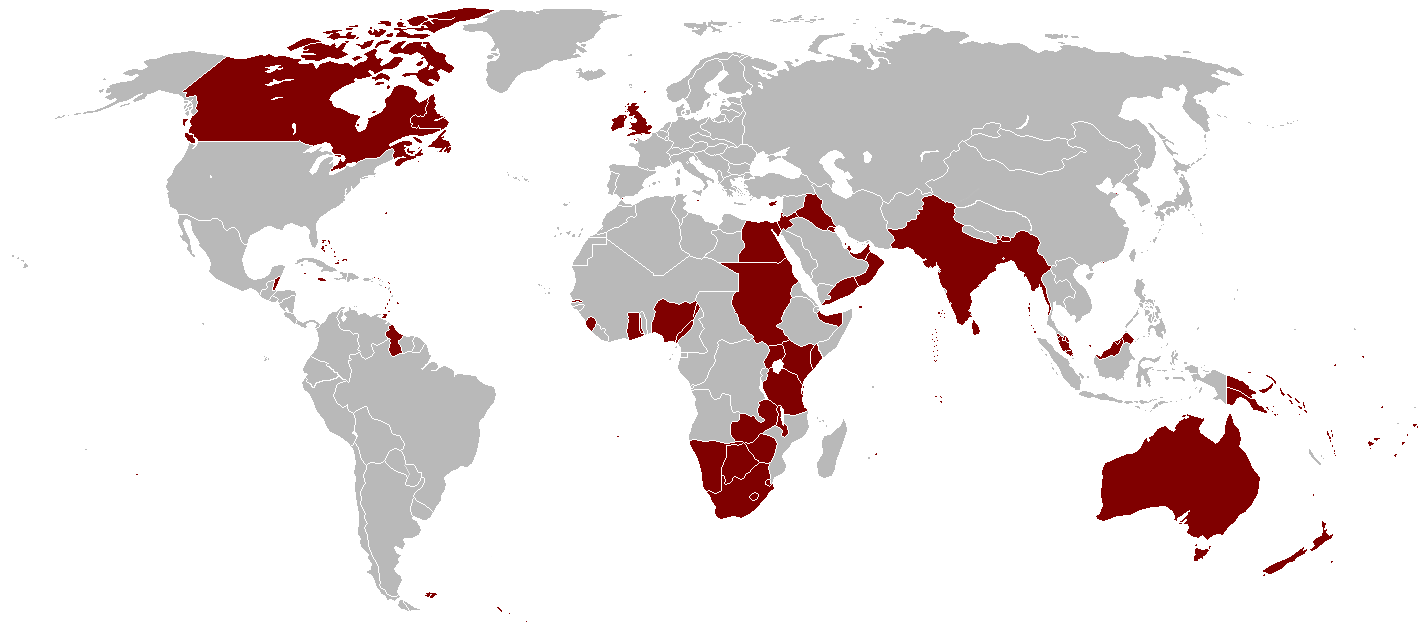
The British Empire at its territorial peak in 1921

Churchill was a staunch imperialist and monarchist, who consistently exhibited a "romanticised view" of the British Empire and its reigning monarch, especially during his last term as premier. He has been described as a "liberal imperialist"; he advocated against indigenous self-rule in the colonies, insisting that the Empire maintained the welfare of those who lived there.

According to Paul Addison, Churchill was opposed to immigration from the Commonwealth. There is also evidence of his support for eugenics, based upon a letter he wrote to Asquith in February 1910 about an "increasingly rapid growth" of feeble-mindedness and insanity in Britain. However, Addison makes the point that Churchill opposed antisemitism (as in 1904, when he was critical of the proposed Aliens Bill), and argues that he would never have tried "to stoke up racial animosity against immigrants, or to persecute minorities".

== Cultural depictions ==
While biographies by Addison, Gilbert, Jenkins and Rhodes James are among the most acclaimed works about Churchill, he has been the subject of numerous others. David Freeman counted 62 in English to the end of the 20th century. At a public ceremony on 30 November 1954, Churchill's 80th birthday, the joint Houses of Parliament presented him with a full-length portrait of himself, painted by Graham Sutherland. Churchill and Clementine reportedly hated it and she had it destroyed.

Biographical films include Young Winston (1972); it featured Simon Ward in the title role. Other depictions were by Robert Hardy in Winston Churchill: The Wilderness Years (1981); Albert Finney in The Gathering Storm (2002); Brendan Gleeson in Into the Storm (2009); and Gary Oldman in Darkest Hour (2017). John Lithgow played Churchill in The Crown (2016–2019). Finney, Gleeson, Oldman, and Lithgow all won awards for their performances.

== Family ==
Churchill married Clementine Hozier in September 1908. They remained married until his death. Churchill was aware of the strain his career placed on their marriage. According to Colville, he had an affair in the 1930s with Doris Castlerosse, although this is discounted by Andrew Roberts.

The Churchills' first child, Diana, was born in July 1909; Randolph, in May 1911, Sarah, in October 1914, and Marigold, in November 1918. Marigold died in August 1921, from sepsis. On 15 September 1922, the Churchills' last child, Mary, was born. Later that month, the Churchills bought Chartwell, which would be their home until Winston's death in 1965.

== Notes ==
Parliament of the United Kingdom
| Preceded by Walter Runciman | Member of Parliament for Oldham; 1900–1906; Served alongside: Alfred Emmott | Succeeded by John Bright |
| Preceded by William Houldsworth | Member of Parliament for Manchester North West; 1906–1908 | Succeeded by William Joynson-Hicks |
| Preceded by Edmund Robertson | Member of Parliament for Dundee; 1908–1922; Served alongside: Alexander Wilkie | Succeeded by Edwin Scrymgeour |
| Preceded by Leonard Lyle | Member of Parliament for Epping; 1924–1945 | Succeeded by Leah Manning |
| New constituency | Member of Parliament for Woodford; 1945–1964 | Constituency abolished |
| Preceded by Dai Grenfell | Father of the House; 1959–1964 | Succeeded by Rab Butler |
Political offices
| Preceded by The Duke of Marlborough | Undersecretary of State for the Colonies; 1905–1908 | Succeeded by Jack Seely |
| Preceded by David Lloyd George | President of the Board of Trade; 1908–1910 | Succeeded by Sydney Buxton |
| Preceded by Herbert Gladstone | Home Secretary; 1910–1911 | Succeeded by Reginald McKenna |
| Preceded by Reginald McKenna | First Lord of the Admiralty; 1911–1915 | Succeeded by Arthur Balfour |
| Preceded by Edwin Montagu | Chancellor of the Duchy of Lancaster; 1915 | Succeeded by Herbert Samuel |
| Preceded by Christopher Addison | Minister of Munitions; 1917–1919 | Succeeded by Andrew Weir |
| Preceded by William Weir | Secretary of State for Air; 1919–1921 | Succeeded by Freddie Guest |
| Preceded by The Viscount Milner | Secretary of State for War; 1919–1921 | Succeeded by Laming Worthington-Evans |
| Preceded by The Viscount Milner | Secretary of State for the Colonies; 1921–1922 | Succeeded by The Duke of Devonshire |
| Preceded by Philip Snowden | Chancellor of the Exchequer; 1924–1929 | Succeeded by Philip Snowden |
| Preceded by The Earl Stanhope | First Lord of the Admiralty; 1939–1940 | Succeeded by A. V. Alexander |
| Preceded by Neville Chamberlain | Leader of the House of Commons; 1940–1942 | Succeeded by Stafford Cripps |
| Preceded by Neville Chamberlain | Prime Minister of the United Kingdom; 1940–1945 | Succeeded by Clement Attlee |
| Preceded by The Lord Chatfield as Minister for Coordination of Defence | Minister of Defence; 1940–1945 | Succeeded by Clement Attlee |
| Preceded by Clement Attlee | Leader of the Opposition; 1945–1951 | Succeeded by Clement Attlee |
| Preceded by Clement Attlee | Prime Minister of the United Kingdom; 1951–1955 | Succeeded by Anthony Eden |
| Preceded by Manny Shinwell | Minister of Defence; 1951–1952 | Succeeded by The Earl Alexander of Tunis |
Academic offices
| Preceded by Andrew Carnegie | Rector of the University of Aberdeen; 1914–1918 | Succeeded by The Viscount Cowdray |
| Preceded by John Gilmour | Rector of the University of Edinburgh; 1929–1932 | Succeeded by Ian Hamilton |
| Preceded by The Viscount Haldane | Chancellor of the University of Bristol; 1929–1965 | Succeeded by The Duke of Beaufort |
Party political offices
| Preceded by Neville Chamberlain | Leader of the Conservative Party; 1940–1955 | Succeeded by Anthony Eden |
Honorary titles
| Preceded by The Marquess of Willingdon | Lord Warden of the Cinque Ports; 1941–1965 | Succeeded by Robert Menzies |
| Preceded by The Viscount Ullswater | Senior Privy Counsellor; 1949–1965 | Succeeded by The Earl of Swinton |
| Preceded by François Mauriac | Laureate of the Nobel Prize in Literature; 1953 | Succeeded by Ernest Hemingway |
Records
| Preceded by Davie Logan | Oldest sitting Member of Parliament; 1964 | Succeeded by Manny Shinwell |
