= SR Battle of Britain class 21C151 Winston Churchill =

Preserved British 4-6-2 steam locomotive

SR 21C151 / BR 34051 Winston Churchill
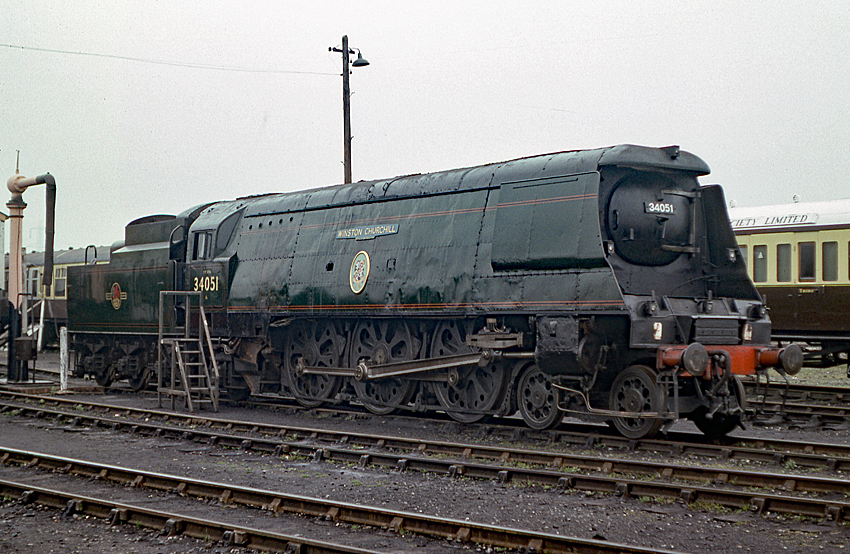
- 34051 Winston Churchill at Didcot
Type and origin
- Power type: Steam
- Builder: Brighton Works
- Build date: 1946
Specifications
- Configuration
  - Whyte: 4-6-2
- Driver dia.: 6 ft 2 in (1.880 m)
- Length: 67 ft 4.75 in (20.54 m)
- Loco weight: 86 long tons 0 cwt (192,600 lb or 87.4 t)
- Fuel capacity: 5 long tons 0 cwt (11,200 lb or 5.1 t)
- Water cap.: 4,500 imp gal (20,000 L; 5,400 US gal)
- Boiler pressure: 280 lbf/in^{2} (1,930.53 kPa),
- Cylinders: Three
- Cylinder size: 16 3/8 in × 24 in (416 mm × 610 mm)
- Valve gear: Bulleid
Performance figures
- Tractive effort: 31,046 lbf (138.10 kN),
Career
- Operators: SR » BR
- Class: Battle of Britain
- Numbers: SR: 21C151; BR: 34051
- Official name: Winston Churchill
- Delivered: 30 December 1946
- Withdrawn: 19 September 1965
- Current owner: National Railway Museum

21C151 Winston Churchill is a Southern Railway Battle of Britain class 4-6-2 Pacific steam locomotive that has been preserved as part of the United Kingdom's National Collection. It is on display at the Locomotion Museum at Shildon.

== Career ==
21C151 was built at Brighton Works in 1946, being released to traffic on 30 December of that year. Initially it was unnamed and paired with 4,500-imperial-gallon (20,000 L; 5,400 US gal) tender 3301. It was first allocated to Salisbury locomotive shed for services on the West of England Main Line between London and Exeter.

=== Naming ===
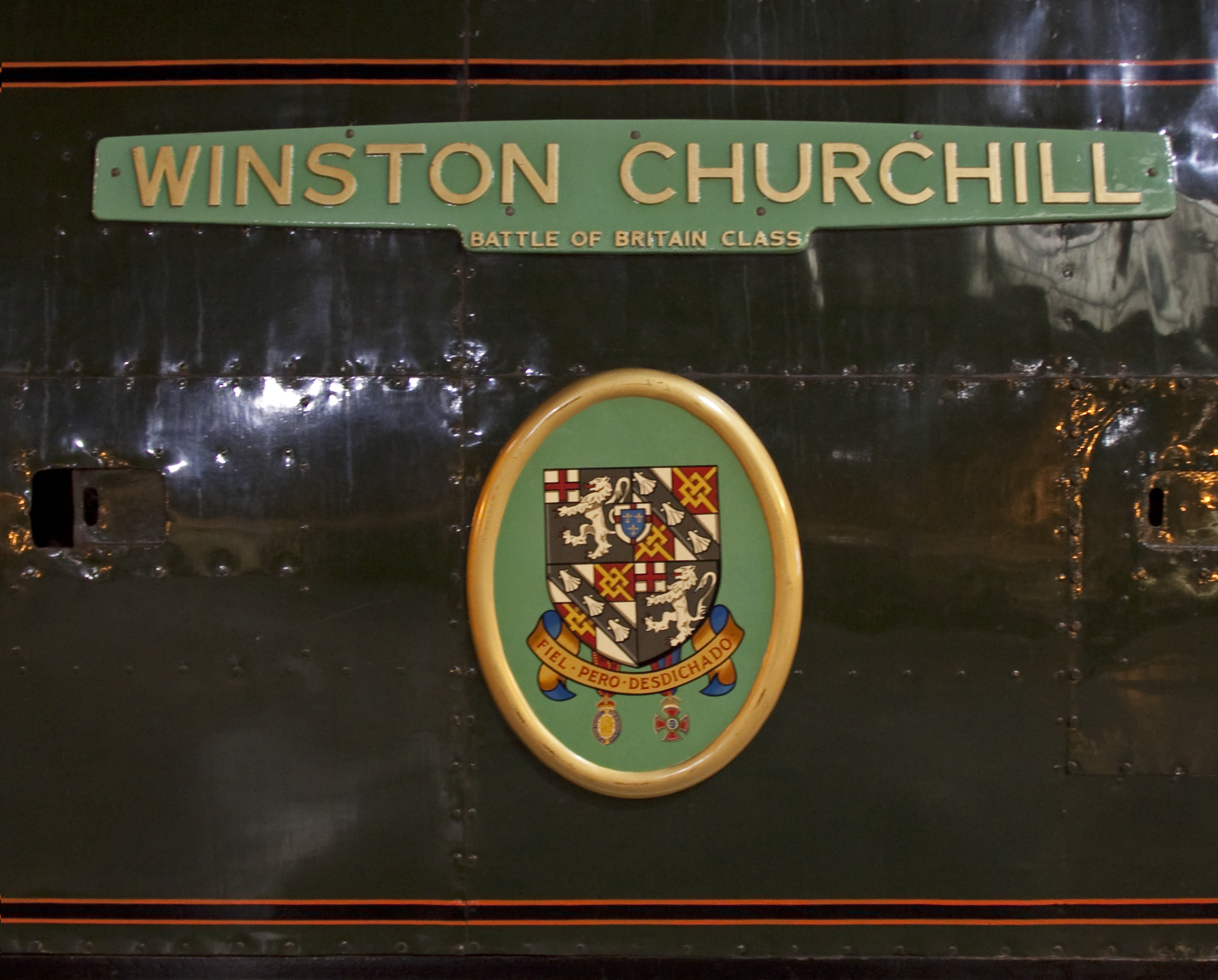
Nameplate and plaque of 21C151 / 34051

21C151 was officially named Winston Churchill in a ceremony at Waterloo railway station on 11 September 1947. The former prime minister, by then Leader of the Opposition, was offered the chance to name the locomotive, but turned it down, claiming a prior engagement. The locomotive was named by Lord Dowding, who also named his own eponymous locomotive at the same ceremony. Churchill was the only person to decline the opportunity to name a Battle of Britain class locomotive after himself.

=== Modifications ===
In July/August 1947 it had its original flat-front cab altered to a more streamlined wedge-shaped, with a larger front window.

=== British Railways ===
It passed to British Railways in January 1948 as part of nationalisation of Britain's railways. However it was October 1948 before it received its British Railways number 34051. It also kept its Southern Railway malachite green with chrome yellow striping until November 1950 when it was repainted into British Railways Brunswick green.

During an overhaul at Eastleigh Works in March 1949, 34051 swapped its tender (number 3301) for tender number 3280, formerly coupled to 21C128 Eddystone (tender 3301 was then attached to 34042 Dorchester).

In February 1950, 34051 moved to Nine Elms locomotive shed in London, and continued to work the West of England Main Line, as well as the Waterloo to Weymouth line. In August that year it had another change of tenders, 3280, its old tender, going to 34065 Hurricane, while 34051 gained tender number 3316 (which 34067 Tangmere had had from new). It would keep this tender for the rest of its British Railways service.

In April 1951 it was reallocated to Exmouth Junction shed, on the eastern outskirts of Exeter. Its opportunities to wander the network of branchlines west of Exeter known as 'The Withered Arm', were cut short when its allocation was changed to Salisbury only two months later.

It stayed at Salisbury for the rest of its career, becoming the shed's 'pet' locomotive, even being noted on the Salisbury and Dorset Junction Railway line in June 1959 on the front of a Salisbury–Wimborne cattle train.

During a General Repair at Eastleigh Works in November/December 1954, 34051 had its boiler pressure reduced from 280 to 250 lbf/in^{2} (1.93 to 1.72 MPa). At its next General, six years later, it was fitted with a speedometer and Automatic Warning System apparatus, and tender 3316 had its cosmetic high-sides removed.

== Funeral train ==
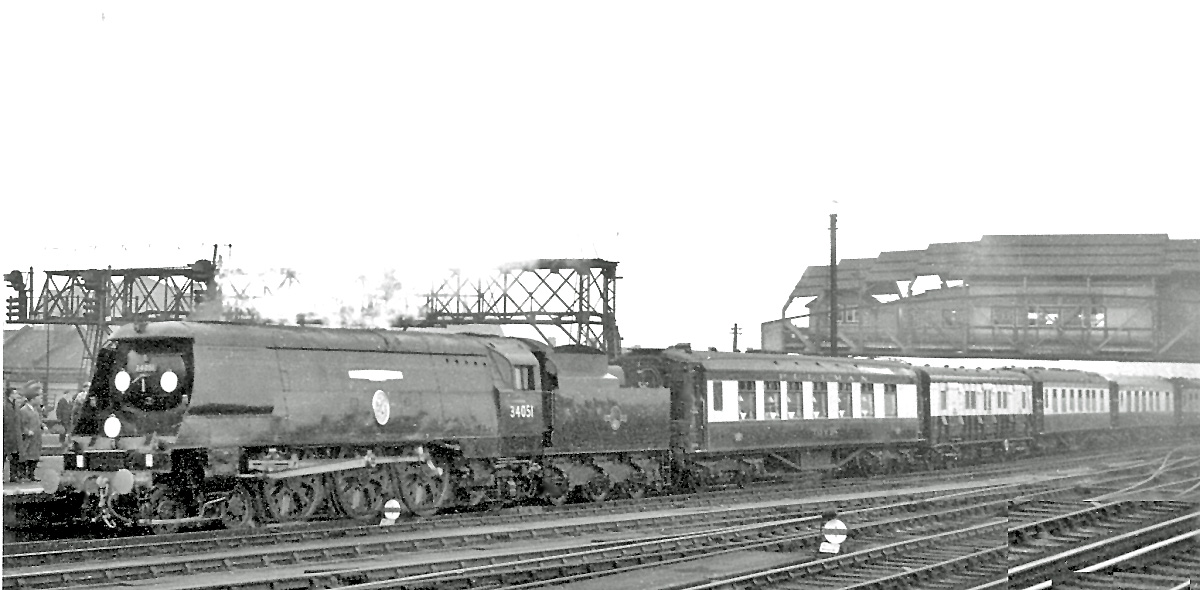
The funeral train passing Clapham Junction; the second carriage is the hearse van.

On 24 January 1965, Sir Winston Churchill died. His state funeral on 30 January 1965 saw his coffin process up the River Thames on the MV Havengore before being transferred to Waterloo Station. A special train had been laid on to take the family to Handborough, seven miles north-west of Oxford. Handborough was the closest station to the parish church of Bladon where Churchill's body was to be interred. The train comprised:

- Battle of Britain class 34051 Winston Churchill,
- Pullman guard-parlour car 208,
- Hearse van S2464S,
- Pullman kitchen-parlour car Carina,
- Pullman kitchen-parlour car Lydia,
- Pullman parlour car Perseus,
- Pullman guard-parlour car Isle of Thanet.

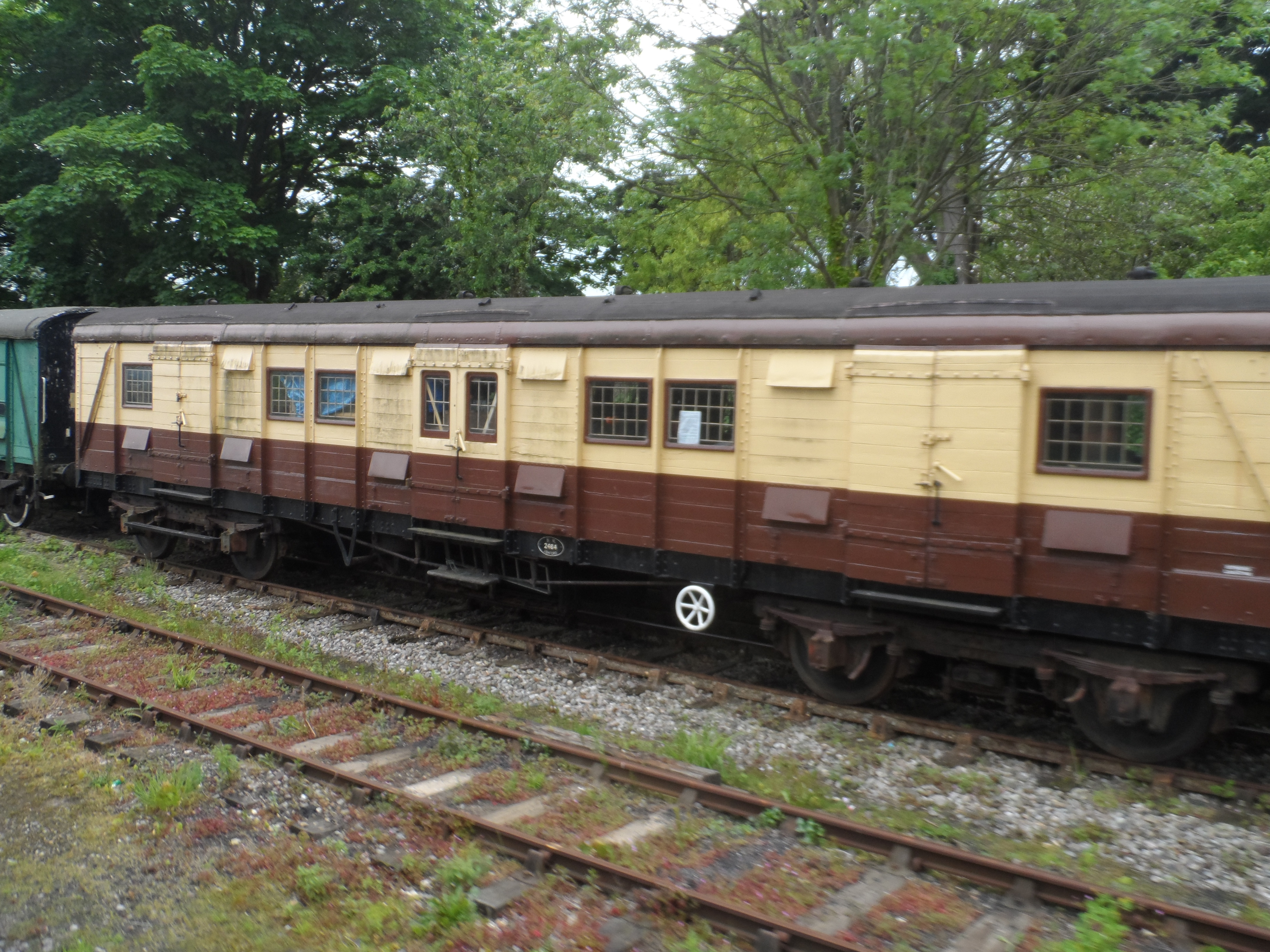
SR Gangwayed Bogie Luggage van no. 2464 at Corfe Castle

The hearse was a Southern Railway 53 ft 3 in (16.23 m) Gangwayed Bogie Luggage van, no. 2464, which was built in 1931 as part of a batch of 30. It had been withdrawn from normal service in 1961, and was set aside and repainted into the Pullman cream and umber colours in July 1962. The van was kept out of public gaze in Stewarts Lane carriage sheds.

While being prepared, the locomotive carried the four discs in an inverted 'T' formation—the headcode for a Royal train, but this was subsequently changed. The headcode used while pulling the special was one disc on each side of the locomotive's smokebox, and a third in the middle of the bufferbeam—a 'V' formation evoking Churchill's 'V for Victory' sign. In normal operation, that headcode would only have been used for a breakdown train.

The train was routed via Barnes, Twickenham, Virginia Water, Ascot, Wokingham and Reading, where it left the Southern Region and joined the Western Region. The train continued to Handborough via Didcot East and North Junctions and Oxford. 34051 then retraced its route back to London light engine, the special train being taken back to Paddington by 'Western' class diesel-hydraulic D1015 Western Champion.

34051 was withdrawn later that year on 19 September 1965, having covered 807,496 miles (1,299,539 km).

== Preservation ==
After hauling Churchill's funeral train, 34051 was earmarked for preservation, so in November 1965, 34051 was moved to Hellifield for storage. It later spent some time at the Didcot Railway Centre. It then resided at the National Railway Museum in York, as part of the UK National Collection. Repainting of the engine was completed at the Mid-Hants Railway at Ropley, Hampshire in December 2014 after which the engine was returned to York for display in the National Railway Museum in time for the 50th anniversary of the death of Winston Churchill on 20 January 2015, but the locomotive remains non-operational. In 2016 it was moved to the NRM's Shildon Locomotion Museum.

All six cars used in Churchill's funeral train survive in preservation, with two Pullmans and the hearse van having spent several years in the United States. S2464S has been on the Swanage Railway since being repatriated. It has been repainted into Pullman umber and cream and is now operational.
