= Havengore =

Havengore may refer to:

- Havengore Island, a marshy island off the North Sea coast of the English county of Essex
- MV Havengore, a Port of London survey launch built in 1956 and famous for its role in the funeral of Sir Winston Churchill
- SY Havengore, a steam yacht built in 1910 and used as a patrol vessel by the Port of London
