= Later life of Winston Churchill =

Life of Winston Churchill, 1945–1965

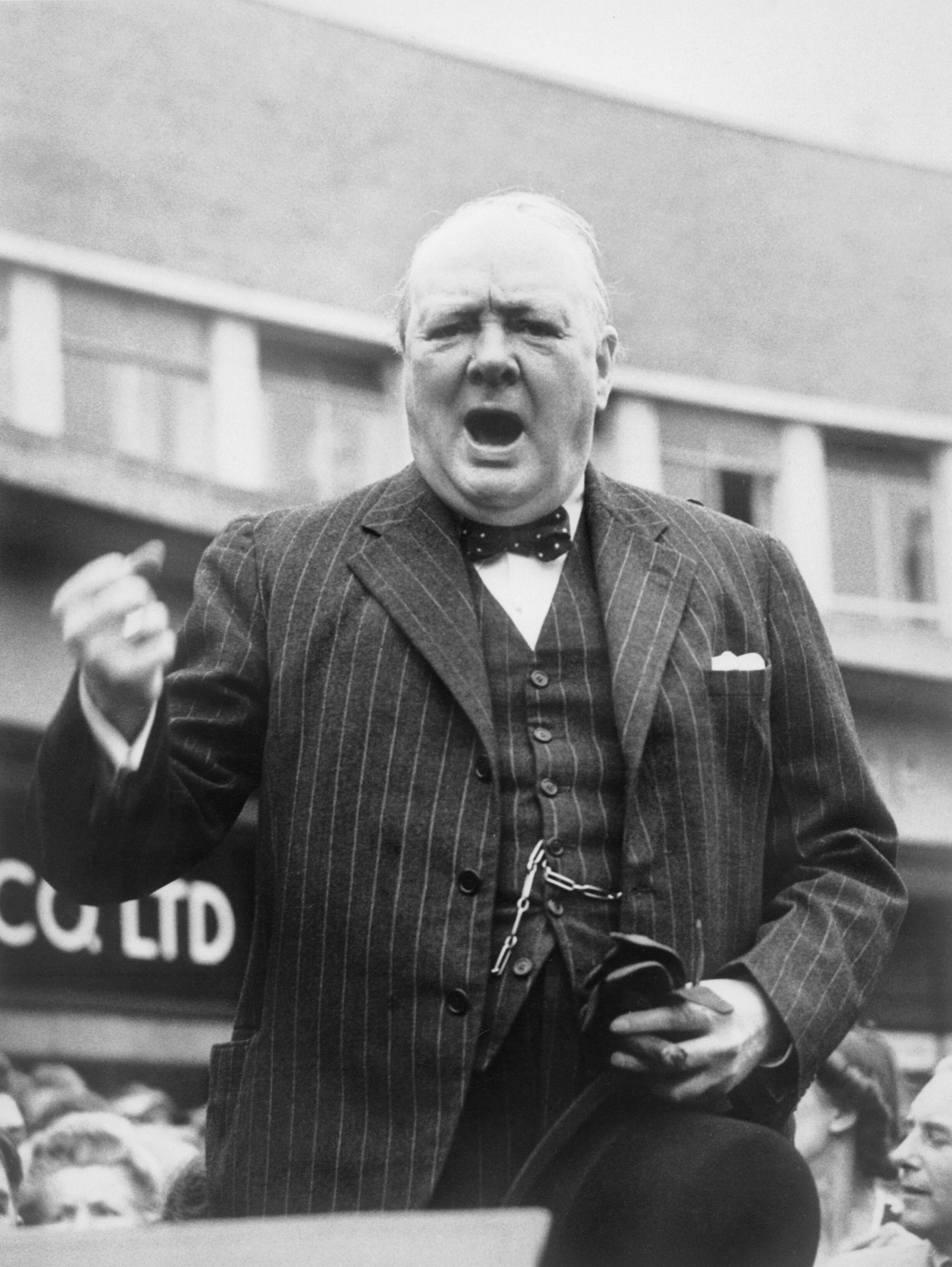
Churchill making a speech in Uxbridge, Middlesex, during the 1945 general election, which his party lost

The Conservative Party led by Winston Churchill lost the July 1945 general election, forcing him to step down as Prime Minister of the United Kingdom. For six years he served as the Leader of the Opposition. During these years he continued to influence world affairs. In 1946 he gave his "Iron Curtain" speech which spoke of the expansionist policies of the Soviet Union and the creation of the Eastern Bloc; Churchill also argued strongly for British independence from the European Coal and Steel Community; he saw this as a Franco-German project and Britain still had an empire. In the General Election of 1951, Labour was defeated.

Churchill became Prime Minister for a second time. He continued to lead Britain but was to suffer increasingly from health problems. Aware that he was slowing down both physically and mentally, he resigned in April 1955. He continued to sit as MP for Woodford until he retired from politics in 1964. Churchill died on 24 January 1965 and was granted the honour of a state funeral. He was buried in his family plot in St Martin's Church, Bladon, near to where he was born at Blenheim Palace.

== Leader of the Opposition, 1945–1951 ==
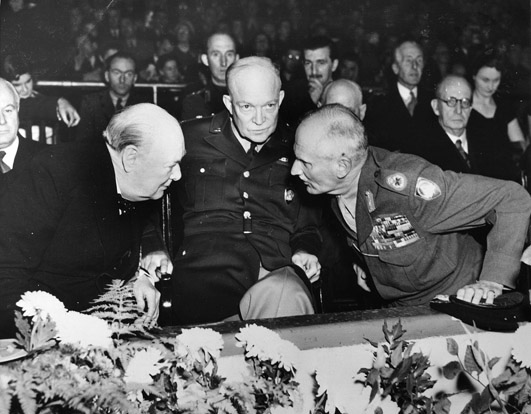
Churchill with American General Dwight D. Eisenhower and Field Marshal Bernard Montgomery at a meeting of NATO in October 1951, shortly before Churchill became Prime Minister for a second time

Following his defeat in the 1945 general election, Churchill became the Leader of the Opposition.

=== Speech in Fulton, Missouri ===
In 1946, Churchill was in America for nearly three months from early January to late March. It was on this trip that he gave his "Iron Curtain" speech about the USSR and its creation of the Eastern Bloc. Speaking on 5 March 1946 in the company of President Truman at Westminster College in Fulton, Missouri, Churchill declared:

From Stettin in the Baltic to Trieste in the Adriatic, an Iron Curtain has descended across the continent. Behind that line lie all the capitals of the ancient states of Central and Eastern Europe. Warsaw, Berlin, Prague, Vienna, Budapest, Belgrade, Bucharest and Sofia, all these famous cities and the populations around them lie in what I must call the Soviet sphere.

The essence of Churchill's view was that the Soviet Union did not want war with the western Allies but that its entrenched position in Eastern Europe had made it impossible for the three great powers to provide the world with a "triangular leadership". Churchill's desire was much closer collaboration between Britain and America, but he emphasised the need for co-operation within the framework of the United Nations Charter. Within the same speech, he called for "a Special Relationship between the British Commonwealth and Empire and the United States".

In 1947, according to a memorandum from the FBI's archives, Churchill allegedly urged the US to conduct a pre-emptive nuclear strike against the Soviet Union in order to win the Cold War while they had the chance. He reportedly spoke to right-wing Republican senator Styles Bridges, asking him to persuade Truman to launch a strike against Moscow to destroy the Kremlin and make it easy to handle the directionless Russia. The memorandum claims Churchill "stated that the only salvation for the civilization of the world would be if the President of the United States would declare Russia to be imperiling world peace and attack Russia". Russia would have been defenseless against a nuclear strike at the time of the Churchill's proposal, since the Soviets did not obtain the atomic bomb until 1949. Churchill's personal physician, Lord Moran, recalled that he had already advocated a nuclear strike against the Soviets during a conversation in 1946. Later, Churchill was instrumental in giving France a permanent seat on the United Nations Security Council, providing another European power to counter-balance the Soviet Union's permanent seat.

=== Europe ===
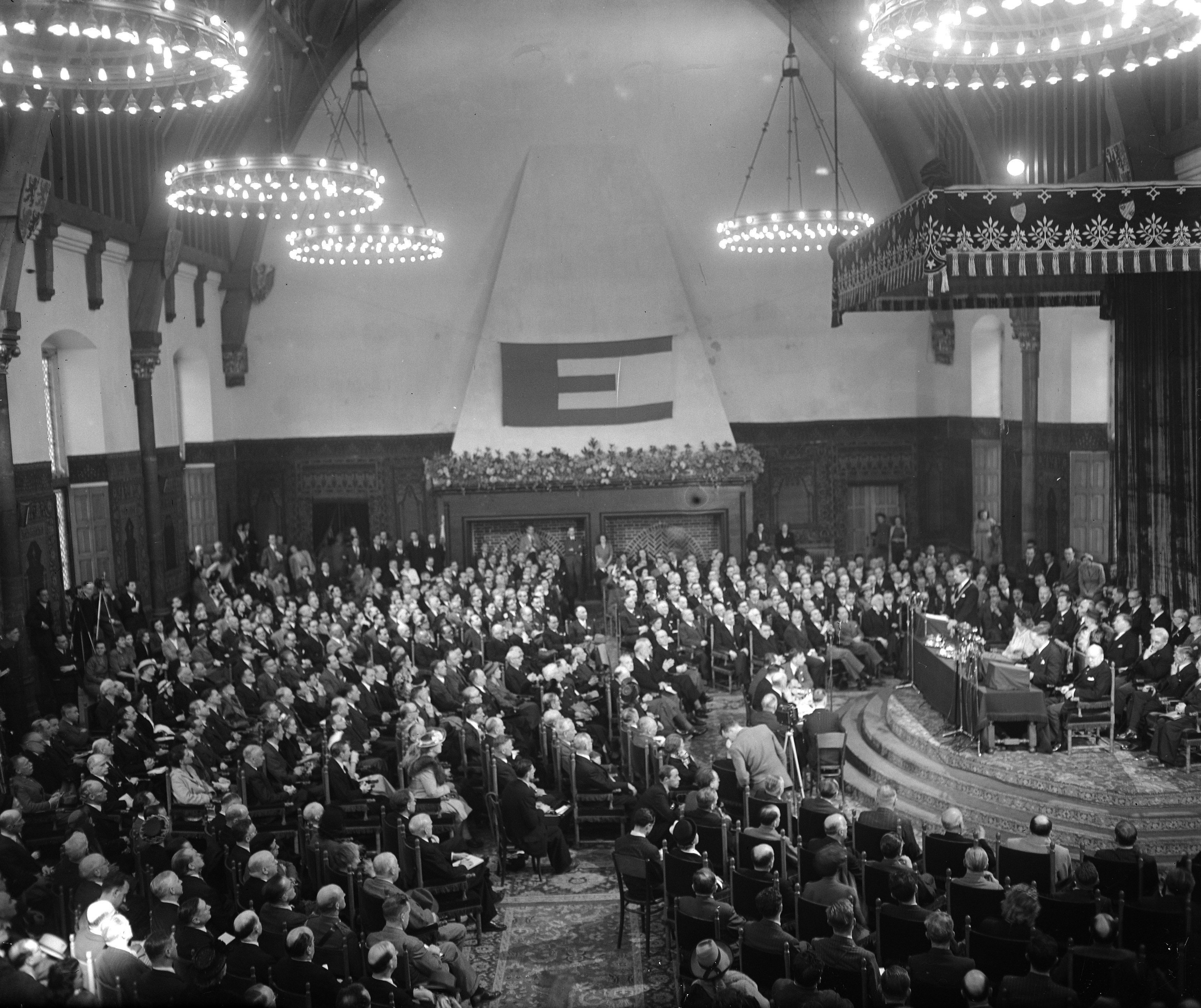
Churchill at the Congress of Europe in the Hague, 8 May 1948.

Churchill was an early supporter of pan-Europeanism as, in the summer of 1930, he had written an article calling for a "United States of Europe", although it included the qualification that Britain must be "with Europe but not of it". In a speech at the University of Zurich in 1946, he repeated this call and proposed creation of the Council of Europe. This would be centred around a Franco-German partnership, with Britain and the Commonwealth, and perhaps the United States of America, as "friends and sponsors of the new Europe". Churchill expressed similar sentiments during a meeting of the Primrose League at the Royal Albert Hall on 18 May 1947. He declared: "Let Europe arise", but he was "absolutely clear" that "we shall allow no wedge to be driven between Britain and the United States". In 1948, he participated in the Hague Congress, discussing the future structure and role of the Council, which was finally founded as the first pan-European institution through the Treaty of London on 5 May 1949.

As the first steps to European unity were taken, and as the new realities of Britain's shrunken role in the world sank in, Churchill changed his position. He advocated the creation of a united Europe that would include Britain. He lent his considerable personal prestige to the Congress of Europe in 1948 in The Hague, where he called for the 16 democratic European countries, "including Great Britain, linked with her Empire and Commonwealth", to start building Europe, aiming “at the union of Europe as a whole”[427]. In referring to the progress which had been made in the year and a half since his Zurich speech, Churchill declared “sixteen European states are now associated for economic purposes, five have entered into close economic and military relationship. We hope that this nucleus will in due course be joined by the people of Scandinavia and of the Iberian Peninsula as well as by Italy….” With Britain not merely among the sixteen but among the five, he was, in the words of his biographer Roy Jenkins “obviously then regarding his country as not merely part of Europe but part of its core”[428].

In Strasbourg, in 1949, he said to the Parliamentary Assembly of the Council of Europe: "we [including Britain] are engaged in the process of creating a European unit in the world."[429] He supported that Assembly drafting proposals for a European Constitution, quoting Napoleon in saying that "a constitution must be short and obscure". In 1950, he used the same platform to call for "the immediate creation of a European Army under a unified command, and in which we should all bear a worthy and honourable part", this army to be "subject to proper European democratic control and acting in full cooperation with the USA and Canada".[430] In November 1951, he called for a "United Europe" in a Cabinet paper[431], but "his foreign secretary and successor as Prime Minister, Anthony Eden, was not a ‘keen European’ and his Europeanism became lost as his health and energy failed".

In June 1950, Churchill was strongly critical of the Attlee government's failure to send British representatives to Paris to discuss the Schuman Plan for setting up the European Coal and Steel Community, saying that: "les absents ont toujours tort" ("the absent are always wrong"). However, he still did not want Britain to be part of any development into a fully federal grouping; nevertheless, he is listed today as one of the "Founding fathers of the European Union". After returning as prime minister, Churchill issued a note for the Cabinet on 29 November 1951 in which he listed Britain's foreign policy priorities as Commonwealth unity and consolidation, "fraternal association" of the English-speaking world (i.e., the Commonwealth and the US), and a "United Europe, to which we are a closely and specially-related ally and friend..... (it is) only when plans for uniting Europe take a federal form that we cannot take part, because we cannot subordinate ourselves or the control of British policy to federal authorities".

In 1961, when Harold Macmillan applied to join the European Economic Community (EEC), Churchill wrote to his Conservative Association in support.

=== Partition of India ===
Churchill continued to oppose the release of India from British control. In a speech to the House of Commons in early March 1947, he warned against handing power to an India government too soon because he believed the political parties in India did not truly represent the people, and that in a few years no trace of the new government would remain.

=== Ireland ===
It was during his opposition years that Churchill twice expounded his views on Ireland to successive Irish ambassadors in London. In November 1946, he met John Dulanty and told him: "I said a few words in parliament the other day about your country because I still hope for a united Ireland. You must get those fellows in the north in, though; you can't do it by force. There is not, and never was, any bitterness in my heart towards your country". In May 1951, he met Dulanty's successor Frederick Boland and said: "You know I have had many invitations to visit Ulster but I have refused them all. I don't want to go there at all, I would much rather go to southern Ireland. Maybe I'll buy another horse with an entry in the Irish Derby". Churchill had happy childhood memories of Ireland from his father's time there as private secretary to the lord lieutenant of Ireland from 1876 to 1880.

=== The Second World War (book series) ===
In the late 1940s, Churchill wrote and published six volumes of World War II memoirs. The series is entitled The Second World War and added his personal thoughts, beliefs and experiences to the historical record as he interpreted it. Churchill traded the literary rights to his books in return for double the salary he made as prime minister. Major points in Churchill's books included his disgust in the handling of Hitler prior to the outbreak of war, primarily with the policy of appeasement which the British and French governments pursued until 1939.

== Prime Minister: 1951–1955 ==
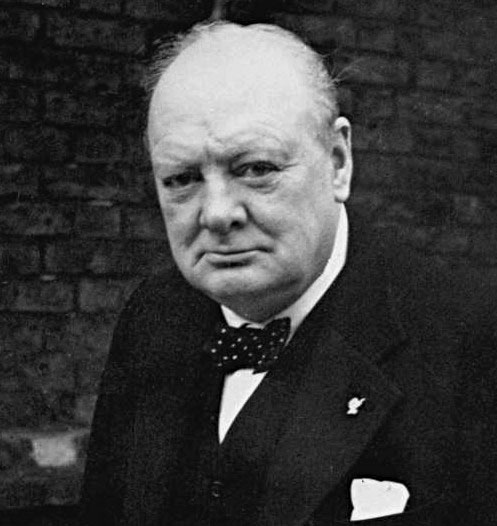
- Second premiership of Winston Churchill; 26 October 1951 – 5 April 1955
- Monarchs: George VI; Elizabeth II
- Cabinet: Third Churchill ministry
- Party: Conservative
- Election: 1951
- Seat: 10 Downing Street
- Coat of arms of HM Government

=== Election result and cabinet appointments ===
The Conservatives won the general election in October 1951 with an overall majority of 17 seats and Churchill again became prime minister, remaining in office until his resignation on 5 April 1955. As in his wartime administration, he appointed himself as Minister of Defence, but only on a temporary basis. On 1 March 1952, he handed over to the reluctant Field Marshal Alexander, who had been serving as Governor General of Canada since 1946. Eden was restored to Foreign Affairs and Rab Butler became chancellor.

A significant appointment was Harold Macmillan as Minister of Housing and Local Government with a manifesto commitment to build 300,000 new houses per annum. Macmillan achieved his target and, in October 1954, was promoted to replace Alexander at Defence. Housing was Churchill's only real domestic concern as he was preoccupied with foreign affairs. His government introduced some reforms including the Housing Repairs and Rents Act 1954 which inter alia addressed the issue of slums, and the Mines and Quarries Act 1954, which in some respects was a precursor to health and safety legislation. Churchill was, however, greatly concerned about immigration from the West Indies and Ian Gilmour records him saying in 1955: "I think it is the most important subject facing this country, but I cannot get any of my ministers to take any notice".

=== Health issues to eventual resignation ===
Churchill was just short of his 77th birthday when he became prime minister again and he was not in good health. The main worry was that he had had a number of minor strokes and he was not heeding their warnings. In December 1951, George VI had become concerned about Churchill's decline and resolved to broach the subject in the new year by asking Churchill to stand down in favour of Eden, but the King had his own serious health issues and died on 6 February without making the request.

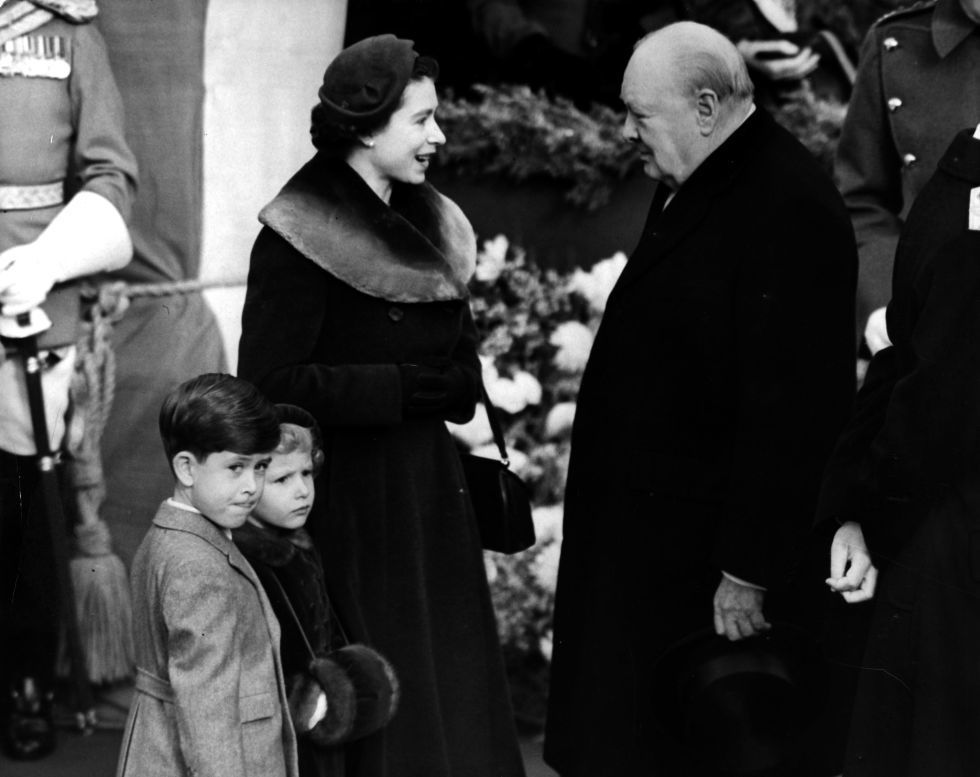
Churchill with Queen Elizabeth II, Prince Charles (future King Charles III) and Princess Anne, 10 February 1953

Because of Churchill's health and his evident inability to focus on paperwork, he was not expected to remain in office for more than a year or so, but he constantly delayed resignation until finally his health necessitated it. One of the main reasons for the delay was that his designated successor Eden also suffered a serious long-term health issue, following a botched abdominal operation in April 1953. George VI was succeeded by Elizabeth II, with whom Churchill developed a close friendship. Some of Churchill's colleagues hoped that he might retire after her Coronation in June 1953 but, in response to Eden's illness, Churchill decided to increase his own responsibilities by taking over at the Foreign Office. Eden was incapacitated until the end of the year and was never completely well again.

Possibly because of the extra strain, Churchill suffered a serious stroke on the evening of 23 June 1953. Despite being partially paralysed down one side, he presided over a cabinet meeting the next morning without anybody noticing his incapacity. Thereafter his condition deteriorated, and it was thought that he might not survive the weekend. Had Eden been fit, Churchill's premiership would most likely have been over. News of his illness was kept from the public and from Parliament, who were told that Churchill was suffering from exhaustion. He went home to Chartwell to recuperate and it was not until November that he was fully recovered. Aware that he was slowing down both physically and mentally, he retired as prime minister in April 1955 and was succeeded by Eden.

=== Foreign affairs ===
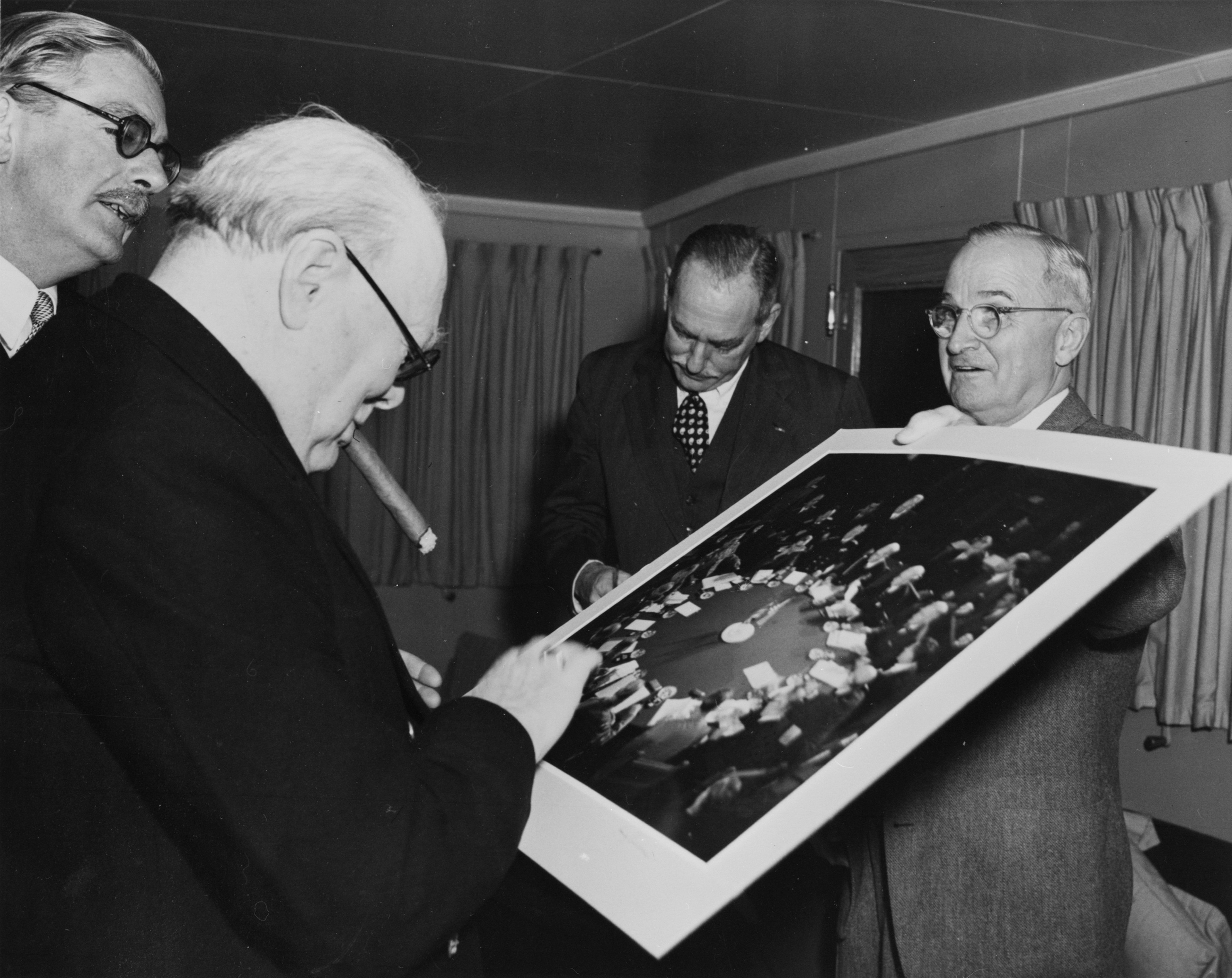
Churchill with Anthony Eden, Dean Acheson and Harry Truman, 5 January 1952.

==== The special relationship ====
Apart from his determination to remain in office for as long as possible, Churchill's main preoccupation throughout his second premiership was with foreign affairs and especially Anglo-American relations. The catalyst for his concern was the H-bomb as he feared a global conflagration and he believed that the only way to preserve peace and freedom was to build on a solid foundation of friendship and co-operation (the "special relationship") between Britain and America. Churchill made four official transatlantic visits from January 1952 to July 1954.

==== Decline of empire ====
The decline of the British Empire had been accelerated by the Second World War and the post-war Labour government pursued a policy of decolonisation. Churchill and his supporters believed that maintenance of Britain's position as a world power depended on the empire's continued existence. A key location was the Suez Canal which gave Britain a pre-eminent position in the Middle East, despite the loss of India in 1947. Churchill was, however, obliged to recognise Colonel Nasser's revolutionary government of Egypt, which took power in 1952. Much to Churchill's private dismay, agreement was reached in October 1954 on the phased evacuation of British troops from their Suez base. In addition, Britain agreed to terminate her rule in Anglo-Egyptian Sudan by 1956, though this was in return for Nasser's abandonment of Egyptian claims over the region. Elsewhere, the Malayan Emergency, a guerrilla war fought by pro-independence fighters against Commonwealth forces, had begun in 1948 and continued past Malayan independence (1957) until 1960. Churchill's government maintained the military response to the crisis and adopted a similar strategy for the Mau Mau Uprising in Kenya (1952–1960).

==== Churchill and Truman ====
Churchill and Eden visited Washington in January 1952. The Truman Administration was supporting the plans for a European Defence Community (EDC), hoping that this would allow controlled West German rearmament and enable American troop reductions. Churchill affected to believe that the proposed EDC would not work, scoffing at the supposed difficulties of language. Churchill asked in vain for a US military commitment to support Britain's position in Egypt and the Middle East (where the Truman Administration had recently pressured Attlee not to intervene against Mossadeq in Iran); this did not meet with American approval as US commitment to the Middle East was seen as supporting British imperialism, and were unpersuaded that this would help prevent pro-Soviet regimes from coming to power.

==== Churchill and Eisenhower ====
Churchill had enjoyed a good political relationship with Truman but was uneasy about the election of Eisenhower in November 1952 and told Colville soon afterwards that he feared war had just become more probable. By July 1953, he was deeply regretting that the Democrats had not been returned and told Colville that Eisenhower as president was "both weak and stupid". The main problem, in Churchill's eyes, was John Foster Dulles, the new Secretary of State, whom he distrusted. Churchill believed that Eisenhower did not fully comprehend the danger posed by the H-bomb: Churchill saw it in terms of horror, Eisenhower as merely the latest improvement in military firepower.

After Stalin's death on 5 March 1953, Churchill proposed a summit meeting with the Soviets but Eisenhower refused out of fear that the Soviets would use it for propaganda. Churchill persisted with his view before and after his stroke, but Eisenhower and Dulles continued to discourage him. One explanation for their cool response was that this was the McCarthy era in the US and Dulles took a Manichean view of the Cold War, but this just added to Churchill's frustration. Churchill met Eisenhower to no avail at the Bermuda Conference in December 1953 and in June/July 1954 at the White House. At the latter, Churchill became annoyed about friction between Eden and Dulles over US actions in Guatemala. By the autumn of 1954, Churchill was threatening, but also postponing, his resignation. In the end it was the Soviets who proposed a four-power summit, but it didn't meet until 18 July 1955, three months after Churchill had retired.

== Retirement and death ==
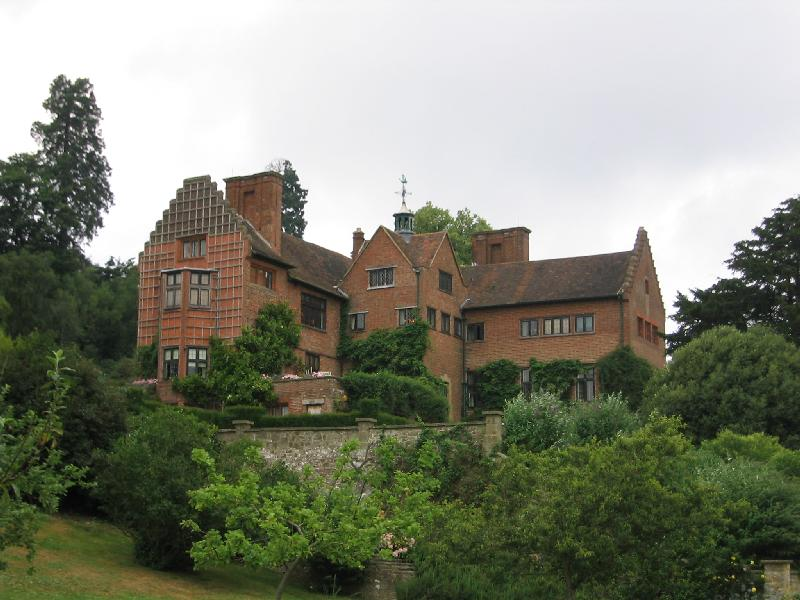
Churchill spent much of his retirement at his home Chartwell in Kent. He purchased it in 1922 after his daughter Mary was born.

Following his stroke, Churchill carried on through 1954 until, aware that he was slowing down both physically and mentally, he retired as prime minister in April 1955 and was succeeded by Eden. Elizabeth II offered to create Churchill Duke of London, but this was declined as a result of the objections of his son Randolph, who would have inherited the title on his father's death. He did, however, accept the Order of the Garter to become Sir Winston. Although publicly supportive, Churchill was privately scathing about Eden's handling of the Suez Crisis and Clementine believed that many of his visits to the United States in the following years were attempts to help repair Anglo-American relations. Churchill reportedly said about Suez: "I would never have done it without squaring the Americans, and once I'd started I'd never have dared stop".

After leaving the premiership, Churchill never again spoke in the Commons, though he remained an MP and occasionally voted in parliamentary divisions. By the time of the 1959 general election, he seldom attended at all. Despite the Conservative landslide under Macmillan's leadership in 1959, Churchill's own majority in Woodford fell by more than a thousand. Following that election, he became Father of the House, the MP with the longest continuous service: he had already gained the distinction of being the only MP to be elected under both Queen Victoria and Elizabeth II. He spent most of his retirement at Chartwell or at his London home in Hyde Park Gate, and became a habitué of high society at La Pausa on the French Riviera. He stood down as an MP before the 1964 general election.

In June 1962, when he was 87, Churchill had a fall in Monte Carlo and broke his hip. He was flown home to a London hospital where he remained for three weeks. Jenkins says that Churchill was never the same after this accident and his last two years were something of a twilight period. In 1963, US President John F. Kennedy, acting under authorisation granted by an Act of Congress, proclaimed him an Honorary Citizen of the United States, but he was unable to attend the White House ceremony. There has been speculation that he became very depressed in his final years but this has been emphatically denied by his personal secretary Anthony Montague Browne, who was with him for his last ten years. Montague Browne wrote that he never heard Churchill refer to depression and certainly did not suffer from it.

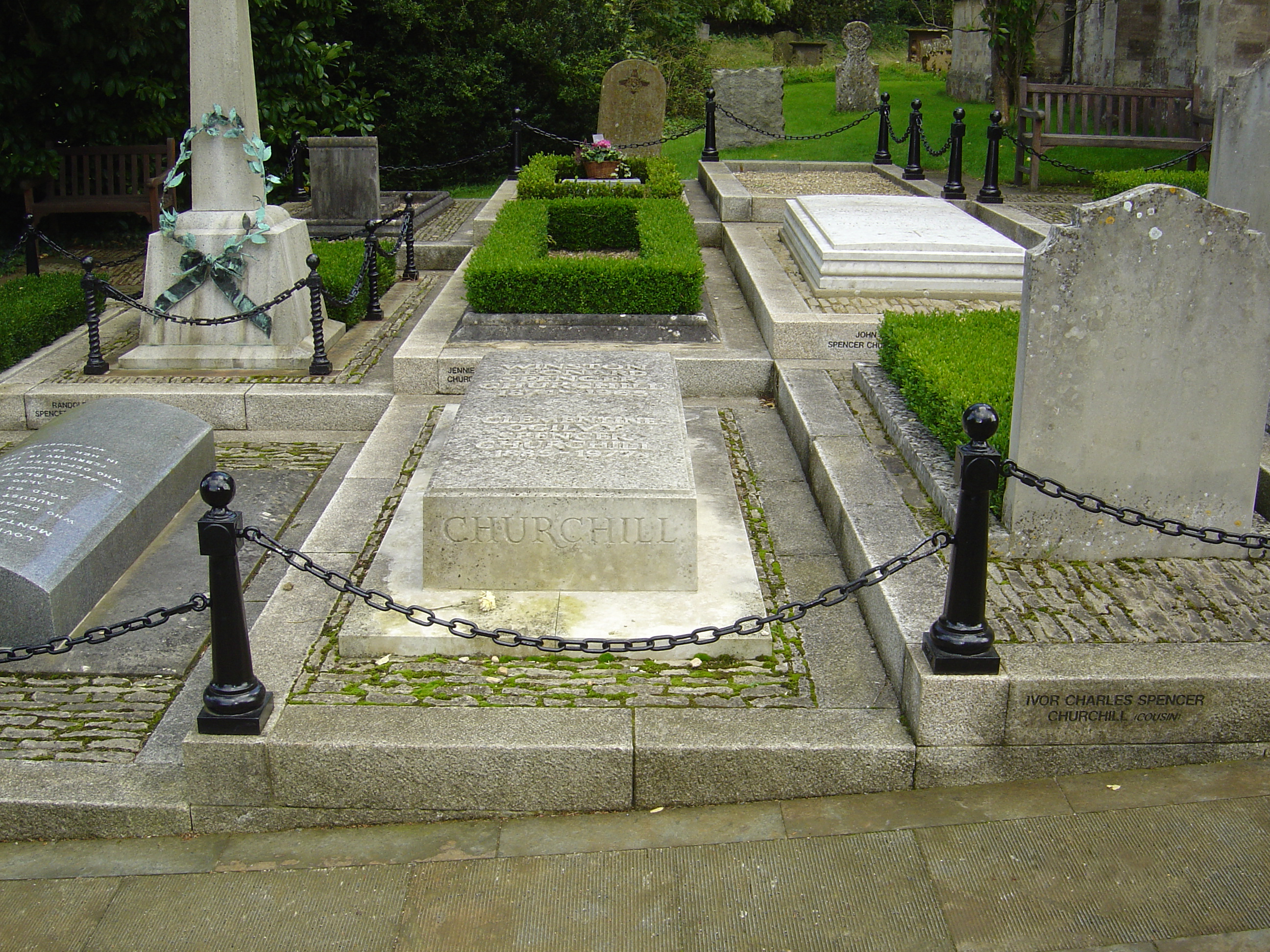
Churchill's grave at St Martin's Church, Bladon.

On 27 July 1964, Churchill was present in the House of Commons for the last time, and one day later, on 28 July, a deputation headed by the prime minister, Sir Alec Douglas-Home, presented Churchill with a Resolution which had been carried unanimously by the House of Commons. The ceremony was held in Churchill's London home at 28 Hyde Park Gate, and was witnessed by Clementine and his children and grandchildren:

That this House desire to take this opportunity of marking the forthcoming retirement of the right honourable Gentleman the Member for Woodford by putting on record its unbounded admiration and gratitude for his services to Parliament, to the nation and to the world; remembers, above all, his inspiration of the British people when they stood alone, and his leadership until victory was won; and offers its grateful thanks to the right honourable Gentleman for these outstanding services to this House and to the nation.

Churchill suffered his final stroke on 10 January 1965. He died two weeks later on 24 January, which was the seventieth anniversary of his father's death. He was given a state funeral six days later on Saturday, 30 January, 1965, the first for a non-royal person since W. E. Gladstone in 1898. Planning for his funeral had begun in 1953 under the code-name of "Operation Hope Not" and a detailed plan had been produced by 1958. His coffin lay in state at Westminster Hall for three days and the funeral ceremony was at St Paul's Cathedral. Afterwards, the coffin was taken by boat along the River Thames to Waterloo Station and from there by a special train to the family plot at St Martin's Church, Bladon, near his birthplace at Blenheim Palace. On 9 February 1965, Churchill's estate was probated at £304,044 (equivalent to £5,147,495 in 2025) of which £194,951 (equivalent to £3,300,540 in 2025) was left following payment of death duties.
