= Evan Jones (police officer) =

Metropolitan Police detective (c. 1902–1976)

Evan William Jones (7 December 1902 - 1976) was a Metropolitan Police detective.

== Life ==
Born in North Wales, he joined the Metropolitan Police as a uniformed officer in 1926 and joined its Special Branch the following year. He took a leading part in counter-terrorism against the IRA in the 1930s and against the Irgun in the final three years of Mandate Palestine, along with counter-espionage during the Second World War.

In 1948, he was put in charge of royal security and on 1 October 1951, he became second-in-command of Special Branch, the youngest officer to fill that role up to that date. He dropped his royal role in 1958, when he became head of Special Branch.

He led the security for world leaders in London to attend the state funeral of Winston Churchill in 1965 and retired the following year.

== Awards and honours ==
For his work as head of Special Branch, he was made a Member, 4th Class of the Royal Victorian Order in the 1960 Birthday Honours.

Police appointments
Preceded by Leonard Burt	Head of Special Branch, Metropolitan Police; 1958–1966	Succeeded by Ferguson Smith
