= Operation Hope Not =

State funeral arrangements for Winston Churchill

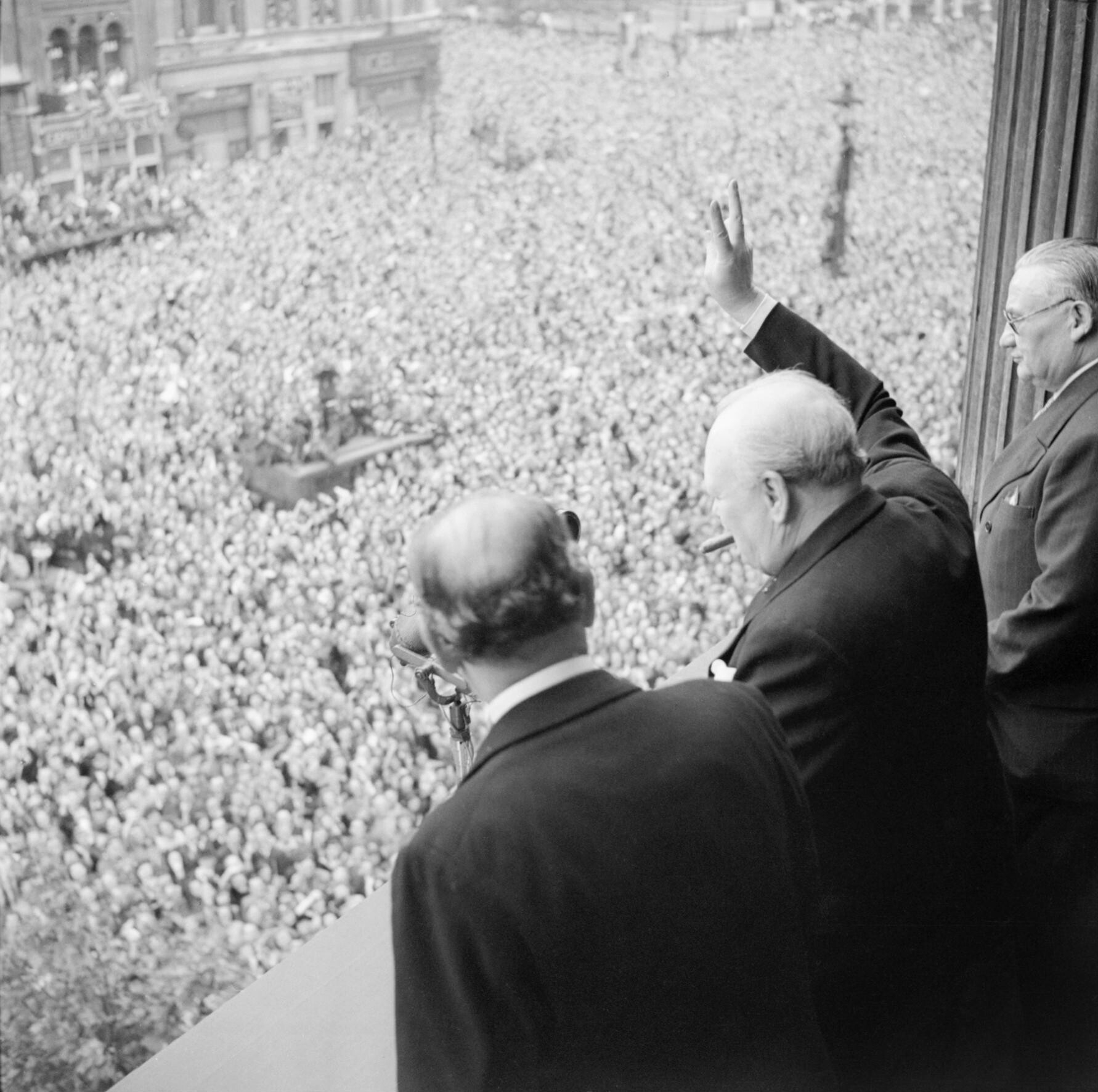
Churchill giving the V sign in Whitehall on the day he broadcast to the nation that the war with Germany had been won, 8 May 1945

Operation Hope Not was the code name of the plan for the state funeral of Sir Winston Churchill. It was titled The State Funeral of The Right Honourable Sir Winston Leonard Spencer Churchill, K.G., O.M., C.H., and was begun in 1953, twelve years before his death. The detailed plan was prepared in 1958. Churchill led the country to victory in the Second World War (1939–1945) during his first term as Prime Minister of the United Kingdom. While in his second term he was struck by a major stroke in 1953 that caused concern for his health. The British Government started a meticulous preparation, as officially decreed by Queen Elizabeth II, to be of a commemoration "on a scale befitting his position in history". As remarked by Lord Mountbatten, Churchill "kept living and the pallbearers kept dying" such that the plan had to be revised several times in the years before his death in 1965.

The official project was undertaken by the Duke of Norfolk, as the Earl Marshal, to be the grandest state funeral for a person outside the royal family since that of Arthur Wellesley, 1st Duke of Wellington. Churchill died on 24 January 1965, and the final plan titled State Funeral of the Late Sir Winston Leonard Spencer Churchill, K.G., O.M., C.H. was issued on 26 January and implemented on 30 January 1965. During the funeral his body lay in state in Westminster Hall. The main funeral service was held at St Paul's Cathedral. The coffin was transported on MV Havengore along the River Thames to Waterloo station, and thence by train to Bladon, Oxfordshire, where it was interred in the St Martin's Church, Bladon, near his father's tomb.

Original copies of the final documents, exceeding 415 pages, issued on 26 January 1965 are held in a number of repositories, and one privately held copy was auctioned in 2017.

== Origin and development ==
Planning for the funeral of Winston Churchill began after the prime minister had a major stroke in 1953. The incident at a party at Downing Street was kept secret by the family. Queen Elizabeth II was among the few who were informed. It was the Queen who insisted that a funeral plan should be prepared should the time come. The venue for lying in state was set in 1957. Writing to the Duke of Norfolk, George Cholmondeley, 5th Marquess of Cholmondeley and the Lord Great Chamberlain, mentioned that Westminster Hall would be the place. The actual plan was initiated in 1958 and was undertaken by the Duke of Norfolk, as the Earl Marshal, to be the grandest state funeral for a person outside the royal family since that of Arthur Wellesley, 1st Duke of Wellington. A letter from Anthony Montague Browne, Churchill's private secretary, to Lady Churchill in the summer of 1958, explained the initiation:

The Queen has intimated that, if it is in accordance with the wishes of the family, there should be plans for Sir Winston to have a State Funeral, and that the Duke of Norfolk, as Earl Marshal, should be responsible for them.

It is suggested that there should be a Lying in State in Westminster Hall followed by the Service at St Paul's Cathedral. This is thought to be more fitting than Westminster Abbey, as St Paul's has the precedents of comparatively recent great national heroes, such as Horatio Nelson, 1st Viscount Nelson and the Duke of Wellington. Thereafter there would be a small private interment service at Chartwell.

I have not told the Duke of Norfolk of Sir Winston's wish to be buried at Chartwell, but the Duke was assuming that it would be in the country (he supposed Blenheim [Blenheim Palace was the birthplace and ancestral home of Churchill]) although Westminster Abbey had offered itself.

Thus the funeral plan was drawn in its elaborate form in 1958, when the then-Prime Minister Harold Macmillan took the initiative. On 21 March 1958, the first draft of the plan, titled Procedure on the Death of Sir Winston Churchill, was produced. The plan was kept as a personal and confidential document. It was decided that Churchill would be carried from Westminster Hall to St Paul's by a gun carriage, from Thames to Gravesend in a two-hour sail, and then to Chartwell in a 25-mile journey which would take 73 minutes. In 1959 a steam yacht St. Katharine was initially proposed for transportation on the Thames, but as it was under repair, the Trinity House yacht Patricia was chosen. The third version of the plan was prepared on 10 February 1960. The boat was changed to MV Havengore, and its exact timing was specified as 12:50 p.m. for departure and 1:05 p.m. for arrival at the destination, now to be adjacent to Waterloo Station. By October 1960 the general details were approved, including invitations and the funeral procession, as indicated in Browne's letter to Lady Churchill on 16 October, stating:

It was agreed that Sir Winston should Lie in State in Westminster Hall. It is proposed that Members of both Houses of Parliament should be present at Westminster Hall when the coffin arrives there, as there will not be space for them all in the Abbey ["Abbey" was struck off and overwritten with "St Paul's?"]. The State Funeral would take place at St. Paul's Cathedral, thereafter the coffin would be taken to Tower Steps, and thence by river to Waterloo Station where a special train would be waiting to go to Woodstock. The few who would be going to Woodstock would go directly from the Cathedral to Waterloo by car.

A hearse van was set aside in 1962 specifically for the funeral train and kept out of public view at Stewarts Lane until needed.

Part of the plan was tested on 28 June 1962 after Churchill, staying at the Hôtel de Paris Monte-Carlo, fell and broke his hip. Fearing the injury to be worse than it actually was, he told Montague Browne "Remember, I want to die in England. Promise me that you will see to it." Montague Browne immediately telephoned Harold Macmillan who activated part of Operation Hope Not. The Royal Air Force returned Churchill to London, against the advice of French doctors that he was not to be moved. Churchill recovered after spending 55 days at Middlesex Hospital.

In July 1962 an elaborate document for the plan was labelled as "Secret". Issued by Major General Sir George Burns from the Horse Guards, it opened with the statement:

1. It has been decided to nominate the senior commander for 'Hope Not', and to issue the detailed orders for the operation on a wider distribution than has been done hitherto. The object is to ensure that plans can be quickly and smoothly put into effect, if and when the time comes.
2. The question of security is all-important. The GOC [General Officer Commanding] London District is most anxious that no reference to the plan should appear in the press before the event, for obvious reasons. He directs service personnel, and requests outside organisations, to see that all documents referring to 'HOPE NOT' should be kept securely locked up when not in use.

In 1963, an official committee was created with the Duke of Norfolk as its chairman. Churchill himself had little to do with the plan. He did tell Harold Macmillan that there would be lively hymns. As a fan of military bands, he asked Anthony Montague Browne to include many military bands, saying, "Remember, I want lots of military bands." The final document completed on 2 November 1964 consisted of 200 pages. The tentative day of the event was marked "D" Day. It was shelved on 26 January 1965 in an envelope marked "Her Majesty's Service".

== Details of the plan ==
The plan was very detailed; all activities were timed to the second. Churchill would be lying in state at Westminster Hall in the Houses of Parliament. From there he in his coffin would be taken by a gun carriage through the streets of London to St Paul's Cathedral, where the funeral service would be held. Inserted in the document was a precise map of the route of the entire procession. The procession was to pass through major locations relevant to Churchill's life, including St Margaret's Church, where he got married. The procession would be led by four Officers of Arms carrying the achievements of a heraldic funeral such as the spurs, crest, targe, and sword. The Earl Marshal with the heralds were to enter the Great West Door of the Cathedral at 10.49 a.m. The Queen's movement was also specified. She would arrive at the cathedral from Buckingham Palace through Godliman Street to the left of the College of Arms. Seats were allotted for the royal family, Churchill's family, the Lord Mayor and family, members of the House of Lords, Foreign Office and privy councillors, ministers, Members of Parliaments, members of the Great Officers of State, judges and legal officers, Knights of the Garter, alderman and representatives of the City of London, members of the civil services, officers and staff of the House of Commons, members of the Royal Navy, members of the Army, members of the Royal Air Force, mayors, Colonial Office, Commonwealth Relations Office, Scottish Office, Northern Ireland Office, London County Council, Merchant Navy, Civil Aviation Authority, industry, the press, and representatives of organisations Churchill was linked to.

From the cathedral, he would be taken to Thames to board the MV Havengore. The boat assigned for the transportation up Thames was commissioned by the Port of London Authority in 1954 and was in service since 1956. It was to carry Churchill's coffin from Tower Pier to Festival Pier. Gun salutes were to be given on the boat exactly for two minutes and 35 seconds. Instructions for music included pipers playing and fading out at exactly two minutes and 45 seconds. Planes would overfly the procession route. From London Waterloo station, the coffin would be transported in a special train to Bladon, the final resting place.

There would be 575 military officers with 6,508 soldiers. Precise timings were allocated for them to have their refreshments. Processional troops would assemble at the Horse Guards Parades, Wellington Barracks and Millbank. Soldiers lining the street would be provided with either tea and buns, or tea and a haversack ration. Evening meal would be provided in the concentration areas or barracks. Pallbearers consisted of two teams from different regiments, the Grenadier Guards and the Queen’s Royal Irish Hussars. The Grenadier Guards would be responsible during the main procession, while the Queen’s Royal Irish Hussars would be responsible for boarding the funeral train and off again and during lowering into the grave. The Earl Marshal's Office would issue invitations and tickets to the service and receive apologies of absence.

There were two additional documents. One was a 47-page-long booklet and titled 'Operation Hope Not' but contained instructions from the London Metropolitan Police (now Metropolitan Police Service). It directed officers and personnel on duty, the parade timings, traffic control, refreshments and location of canteens, first aid facilities, uniforms, the route to be taken by the Queen and the royal families, and the funeral procession. The other document named Operation Order No 801 was 59 pages long and strictly concerned with traffic systems and security patrols. Timings for traffic lights, opening, and closing of bridges over Thames, to be monitored by 527 officers were specified. 282 officers would oversee security from the night before the funeral. It also gave exact time table for police duties from morning (2 a.m.) of the funeral day to 1.25 p.m. when the train would leave Waterloo.

=== Later modifications ===
In the course of time certain details of the plan were modified to suit the changing situations. According to Lord Mountbatten, the changes were necessary because Churchill "kept living and the pallbearers kept dying." One change was the place of burial. Churchill originally willed that he be buried in his croquet lawn at Chartwell, in Kent, but since he was to be given a full state funeral, a more respectable graveyard, St Martin's Church at Bladon, was chosen. What inspired the change of burial was that Churchill visited Bladon in late 1959, where his ancestors were interred, including his father Lord Randolph Churchill. Tapping over an empty plot he was heard to remark, "This is my place here." He changed his will for burial on 31 December 1959.

Before the plan was made, Churchill had originally willed that he be cremated and his ashes be buried at his Chartwell home near the pet cemetery where his two prized dogs Rufus I (died in 1947) and Rufus II (died in 1962) were buried. In 1964, Lady Churchill suggested as an accomplishment of this will a cremation before the lying in state, but was argued by the Archbishop of Canterbury that embalming would be a more appropriate choice for the public impression. J. H. Kenyon Ltd. of Paddington, London, the funeral directors to the Royal Household since 1928, were assigned for the embalming.

When Churchill discussed his plan for burial in Bladon in 1959, the VIP guest list was also prepared. Among the list of invitees was the French President Charles de Gaulle, whom Churchill and Franklin D. Roosevelt had distrusted as leader of the French during and after World War II. As the Duke of Norfolk read the name of de Gaulle, Churchill objected to the inclusion. Though on the same side during World War II, Churchill felt that de Gaulle had a perennial enmity towards England. To him de Gaulle had been "a man who looks like a female llama surprised in her bath," "a bitter foe of Britain" who "hates England and has left a trail of Anglophobia behind him everywhere." Supporting Churchill, Roosevelt had remarked de Gaulle as dictatorial and having a "Messianic complex." Churchill and Roosevelt had even hatched a plot to overthrow de Gaulle from the French leadership. It was after an earnest pleading from the Duke of Norfolk to include the French President for political reasons that Churchill finally agreed. In 1960, the proposal for transporting the coffin from the Thames was at Paddington station, but as a recompense of his wish, Churchill demanded London Waterloo station, a more circuitous route, which was accepted. Churchill's choice of Waterloo had no particular reason other than his "impish sense of humour;" being amused with the picture that de Gaulle would have to walk bare-headed under the Waterloo archway that marked Britain's victory over France in the Battle of Waterloo.

=== Implementation ===
Churchill died on 24 January 1965. By decree of the Queen, his body lay in state in Westminster Hall for three days from 27 January, before the actual state funeral of Churchill on 30 January. The funeral plan was implemented by the Duke of Norfolk, Bernard Fitzalan-Howard. The plan detailed the roles of more than 1,000 people, government and military authorities. The last version of Operation Hope Not was issued under the "London District: Special District Order" by Major-General E.J.B. Nelson, General Officer Commanding London District and Major-General Commanding of the Household Brigade on 26 January.

During the funeral Churchill's body lay in state in Westminster Hall. The main funeral service was held at St Paul's Cathedral. The coffin was transported on MV Havengore along the River Thames to Waterloo station, and thence by train to Bladon, Oxfordshire, where it was interred in the St Martin's Church, Bladon, near his father's tomb.

== The document ==
The final document was titled State Funeral of the Late Sir Winston Leonard Spencer Churchill, K.G., O.M., C.H. and started with the instructions for "Movement of the military and civilian organisation". It consisted of 115 pages of texts and more than 300 pages of maps. Copies of the documents were kept at Arundel Castle Archives in West Sussex, Churchill Archives Centre of Churchill College, College of Arms in London and the National Archives in Kew. Following the 30-year secrecy policy, they were first displayed for public viewing on 31 January 1995. One of the original copies belonged to Philip Bainbridge from the B2 team of Scotland Yard. After execution of the plan, Bainbridge gave it to his daughter Janet Burnett for her anniversary present. Burnett gave the documents for auction. The copy of the plans were sold for £472 in Farleigh Court Golf Course in Surrey on 22 February 2017. Responding to why she sold them, Burnett said that she could not decide which of her six grandchildren she would pass them on to.

== Cultural references ==
Operation Hope Not was featured in the BBC documentary Churchill: A Nation’s Farewell hosted by Jeremy Paxman in 2015.

Operation Hope Not was the central theme in David R. Stokes' historical fiction novel The Churchill Plot in 2017 (republished as The Hope Not Plot: A Novel of Churchill's Final Farewell in 2025).

== See also ==
- Operation London Bridge, the plan for the funeral of Queen Elizabeth II
