= Albert Canning (police officer) =

English police officer

Albert Canning (2 August 1885 - 1969) was a Metropolitan Police officer and from 1936 to 1946 as head of its Special Branch.

Born in Woolwich, Canning spent eight years as a clerk in the Army Service Corps and in the 4th Queen's Own Hussars (1901-1908) before joining the Metropolitan Police on 15 February 1909 as part of K (Bow) Division. After less than a year on uniform duties he was transferred to Special Branch, with which he spent the rest of his career. He was attached to the army throughout the First World War, gaining a commission, founding the first incarnation of the Intelligence Corps and accompanying George V on his visits to the Western Front. In 1925 he accompanied the future Edward VIII on a Dominions, colonies and overseas tour.

He rose to Chief Detective Inspector in 1930, Detective Superintendent in 1932 and Chief Constable in 1936, the same year as he was appointed head of Special Branch. He was made an Officer of the British Empire in 1938 and - for accompanying the King and Queen on the 1939 royal tour of Canada - a Member, 4th Class of the Royal Victorian Order.

Police appointments
Preceded by James McBrien	Head of Special Branch, Metropolitan Police; 1936–1946	Succeeded by Leonard Burt
