= Special Branch (Metropolitan Police) =

UK police unit

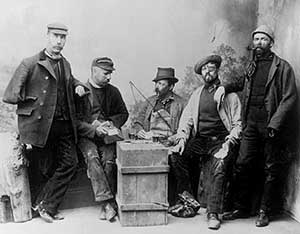
Special Branch detectives on an undercover operation at the London Docks, 1911

Special Branch was a unit in the Metropolitan Police in London, formed as a counter-terrorism unit in 1883 and merged with another unit to form Counter Terrorism Command (SO15) in 2006. It maintained contact with the Security Service (MI5) and had responsibility for, among other things, personal protection of (non-royal) VIPs and performing the role of examining officer at designated ports and airports, as prescribed by the Terrorism Act 2000.

== History ==
In response to the escalating terror campaign in Britain carried out by the militant Irish Fenians in the 1880s, the Home Secretary Sir William Harcourt established the first counter-terrorism unit ever in 1883, named Special Irish Branch, to combat Irish republican terrorism through infiltration and subversion. It initially formed a section of the Criminal Investigation Department within the London Metropolitan Police.

Harcourt envisioned a permanent unit dedicated to the prevention of politically motivated violence through the use of modern techniques such as undercover infiltration. This pioneering branch was the first to be trained in counter-terrorism techniques. In 1886 its name was changed to Special Branch as its remit had gradually expanded to incorporate a general role in counter-terrorism, combating foreign subversion, and infiltrating organized crime and trade unions, becoming the largest Special Branch in the United Kingdom. Although it later became independent of the Criminal Investigation Department (CID), its officers were entitled to use the prefix "Detective" in front of their ranks.

The Special Branch set up an undercover unit in March 1968 initially to infiltrate "left-wing direct-action groups" and later a wider remit, with the approval of the Labour government. It was first called the Special Operations Squad and later renamed the Special Demonstration Squad (SDS). It was disbanded in 2008, and in 2014 the Undercover Policing Inquiry was established to investigate the abuses carried out by the unit.

Special Branch investigated the General Post Office Tower bombing in 1971 and the following year the investigative wing of its "X squad" became the Anti-Terrorist Branch (SO13). It also investigated the sieges at Balcombe Street in 1975 and the Iranian Embassy in 1980, the Libyan Embassy shooting in 1984, along with the bombings at Hyde Park and Regent's Park in 1982, Harrods in 1983, Brighton in 1984, and Bishopsgate in 1993.

The attempted bombing by Nezar Hindawi of an El Al flight from Heathrow to Israel in 1986 was also investigated by Special Branch, along with Provisional IRA mortar attacks on Downing Street in 1991 and Heathrow in 1994 and their Canary Wharf bomb in 1996. Beyond that campaign, it led the investigations into the racist and homophobic 1999 London nail bombings along with Richard Reid in 2001 and the bombings and attempted bombings in London in July 2005. The formation of SO13 had begun a process which on 2 October 2006 culminated in Special Branch and SO13 merging to form Counter Terrorism Command (SO15).

== Commanding officers ==
- 1883: Adolphus Williamson (DCI) (Note: DCI – Detective Chief Inspector)
- 1887: John Littlechild (DCI)
- 1893: William Melville (DSU) (Note: DSU – Detective Superintendent)
- 1903: Patrick Quinn (DSU)
- 1918: James McBrien
- 1936: Albert Canning
- 1946: Leonard Burt (CDR) (Note: CDR – Commander)
- 1958: Evan Jones
- 1966: Ferguson Smith
- 1972: Victor Gilbert
- 1977: Robert Bryan
- 1981: Colin Hewett
- 1986: Simon Crawshaw
- 1987: Peter Phelan
- 1991: John Howley
- 1996: Barry Moss
- 1999: Roger Pearce
- 2003: Janet Williams (CDR)
