= Patrick Quinn (Metropolitan Police officer) =

Irish police officer

Sir Patrick Quinn MVO KPM
- Born: Patrick Quinn; 1855; Ireland
- Died: 9 June 1936 (aged 80–81); Putney, London, England
- Police career
- Country: (United Kingdom of Great Britain and Ireland) United Kingdom
- Department: Metropolitan Police Service
- Service years: 1883–1918

Sir Patrick Quinn MVO KPM (1855 – 9 June 1936) was an Irish officer of the Metropolitan Police.

== Biography ==
Quinn was born in 1855, the third son of Timothy Quinn and Bridget Nalty of County Mayo. He joined the Metropolitan Police on 30 June 1873 with the warrant number 57003. In 1883, he was attached to the Criminal Investigation Department at Scotland Yard, and to the Special Branch of the CID in 1887. He was Superintendent of the Special Branch from 1903 until retirement.

During his time at Special Branch he was engaged in the suppression of anarchism, and attached for protection duty to the suites of all foreign sovereigns visiting the United Kingdom, as a part-precursor of today's Protection Command. As a result, he received a large number of foreign orders and decorations: he was an Officer of the Legion of Honour and an officier de l'Instruction Publique of France, a Knight of the Order of the Dannebrog of Denmark, of the Order of Vasa of Sweden, of the Order of St Olav of Norway, of the Order of St Stanislas of Russia, of the Order of the Redeemer of Greece, of the Order of the Crown of Italy and of the Order of Villa Viçosa of Portugal, and a member of the first class of the Order of Military Merit of Spain.

In terms of British honours, he was a member of the fifth class of the Royal Victorian Order and was awarded the King's Police Medal. He retired at the rank of Superintendent on 1 January 1919 and was knighted at Buckingham Palace on 18 March the same year. Quinn lived at 28 Montserrat Road, SW15. He died at home in Putney on 9 June 1936.

Police appointments
Preceded by William Melville	Head of Special Branch, Metropolitan Police; 1903–1918	Succeeded by James McBrien
