= Leonard Burt (born 1892) =

British police chief

Leonard James Burt, CVO, CBE (1892–1983) was a British police officer involved in several high-profile cases and investigations.

== Life ==
Burt was born on 20 April 1892 in Totton in Hampshire the son of Charles Richard Burt and his wife Sarah Mary Starks.

In May 1938, Suffolk businessman William Murfitt was murdered by poisoning at his home in Risby, Suffolk. Burt was one of a pair of detectives sent from Scotland Yard to investigate the sensational murder. Although Burt believed he had identified the killer, according to a document found many years later by retired editor David Williams, he lacked sufficient evidence for prosecution.

On 16 June 1945, as a Commander in the Metropolitan Police Special Branch, Burt was assigned to accompany two war-time traitors, John Amery and William Joyce (also known as "Lord Haw-Haw") back to London to be tried for treason, after their capture in Germany. They were flown back in a Douglas Dakota with three armed troops as escort.

On 2 February 1950, Burt arrested German atomic spy Klaus Fuchs, who was charged under the Official Secrets Act with espionage for passing British and American atomic secrets to the Soviet Union. Burt was also involved in the investigations into other spies such as Alan Nunn May.

In February 1952, Burt escorted Queen Elizabeth II back from her trip to Kenya after her father George VI died.

Burt wrote an autobiography entitled Commander Burt of Scotland Yard, published in 1959. He died in Fulham on 3 September 1983.

== Family ==
In 1917 he married Grace Airey.

== Bibliography ==
- Burt, Leonard (1959). Commander Burt of Scotland Yard. London: Heinemann. OCLC 923285613.
- Williams, David John. Poison Farm: A Murderer Unmasked After 60 Years. Thorogood Publishing, 2005.
- Stephen's Study Room: British Military & Criminal History in the period 1900 to 1999 - Klaus Fuchs
- Love and treachery, The Daily Telegraph, 9 May 2005

Police appointments
Preceded by Albert Canning	Head of Special Branch, Metropolitan Police; 1946–1958	Succeeded by Evan Jones
