= Merrill Mueller =

American television journalist (1916–1980)

- Mueller in military uniform August 1945
- Born: Merrill Mueller; January 27, 1916; New York City, New York, U.S.
- Died: November 30, 1980 (aged 64); Los Angeles, California, U.S.
- Other name: Red
- Citizenship: United States
- Education: Springfield College (1 year)
- Occupation: Journalist
- Years active: 1935–1979
- Spouse: Jane
- Children: Kenneth; Kevin
- Father: Carl Mueller
- Awards: Overseas Press Club Award; Polk Award

Merrill Mueller (January 27, 1916 – November 30, 1980) was an American journalist whose reporting included breaking the story of Hitler's invasion of Poland. He worked for numerous news agencies including the Independent News Service and NBC. While working for NBC he covered, along with other news anchors, the assassination of John F. Kennedy.

== Biography ==
Merrill Mueller was born in 1916 in New York City. His father, Carl Mueller (1892–1970), was a noted artist and illustrator.

Mueller attended public schools in Connecticut before taking one year at Springfield College. Dropping out, he began his career as a reporter at the Buffalo Times before moving to New York and eventually moving to get a job at the Independent News Service (INS) in Washington, D.C.

At the direction of the INS he briefly covered the Spanish Civil War before moving to report from France, years later while visiting Warsaw, Poland he uncovered Hitler's plan to invade Poland. Quickly traveling back to Paris he broke the story to America. He continued to cover the war and reported live the fall of France. In 1942 he resigned from INS to become an NBC reporter, breaking all the main events in the European theatre. During the Normandy landings on D-Day (June 6, 1944), he filed reports from Eisenhower's headquarters. During the Battle of the Bulge, when Germany surprised the Allies by breaking out at the Ardennes Forest, Mueller reported on how the Soviets were refusing to communicate with General Eisenhower, the head of the Supreme Headquarters Allied Expeditionary Force, during the battle. Amid fears of scandal if the British and American public found out about Stalin's silence, the story was suppressed and Mueller was banished from the European theatre. Mueller was then transferred back to America before moving on to cover the war against the Japanese. There he reported on the dropping of the atomic bomb on Hiroshima and he made the broadcast that reported the surrender of Japan.

After the war Mueller directed NBC's London bureau for four years before returning to America in 1952. There he covered the presidential desk for NBC as well as producing a number of radio and TV programs. During Alan Shepard's historic Freedom 7 mission on May 5, 1961, Mueller was again the broadcaster and after famously reporting, "'He looks so lonely up there …' he fell silent for the first time in his career." Even after returning to the United States, Mueller covered international events; for example, in 1965, he co-anchored NBC's coverage of the state funeral of Winston Churchill with Chet Huntley and David Brinkley from London.

In 1968 he left NBC for the American Broadcasting Company before retiring in 1979; he died one year later.

With his wife Jane, Merrill Mueller had two sons, Kenneth and Kevin.

Mueller received an award from the Overseas Press Club for "the best reporting of foreign affairs from abroad by radio" in 1947.

== Sources ==
- Barbree, Jay Barbree (May 4, 2011). "How America's first astronaut 'got it done' in 1961". NBC News. Archived from the original on December 25, 2014.
- Irving, David John Cawdell (1981). The war between the generals. Congdon & Lattès. ISBN 9780865530157.
- The Northward Contrail (January 25, 2008). "Election night 1960". The Northward Contrail.
- Wisconsin Historical Society (2013). "Merrill Mueller Papers, 1935–1976". Wisconsin Historical Society.
