= James McBrien =

British detective

James McBrien MVO MBE (30 November 1869 - 1958) was a Metropolitan Police officer and detective.

== Life ==
A Roman Catholic born at Gortmore, County Cavan, Ireland, he joined the Metropolitan Police on 27 May 1889, initially spending two years in uniform in the West End and Soho, including a call-out to the anarchist Autonomy or Autonomie Club in a cellar on Great Windmill Street in which he managed to disarm a man threatening others with a knife, get him out of the building and arrest him. Next, his knowledge of French and other languages gained him a transfer to plainclothes work.

He then served in Special Branch under William Melville and Patrick Quinn, including long periods abroad investigating anarchist terrorist networks and as bodyguard to Edward VII in Marienbad and Biarritz and to Queen Alexandra. Whilst in London, he was employed against the suffragette arson and bombing campaign and German spies during the First World War.

In 1918 he succeeded Quinn as head of Special Branch, infiltrating IRA units on mainland Britain and arresting 110 of their members on 11 March 1923 at the height of the Irish Civil War, as well as monitoring workers in the 1926 General Strike and Communists. He remained at the head of Special Branch until retirement to Wimbledon on 30 November 1929 at the rank of Superintendent. He is buried at Gap Road Cemetery.

== Honours ==
He received fourteen decorations, some from monarchies abolished in the post-war period. These included bein appointed an MBE in the 1923 Birthday Honours and a Member, 5th Class, of the Royal Victorian Order in the 1930 New Year Honours (with effect from 11 December 1929) for his royal work.

Police appointments
Preceded by Patrick Quinn	Head of Special Branch, Metropolitan Police; 1918–1929	Succeeded by Edward Parker
