= Death and state funeral of Winston Churchill =

1965 funeral of British prime minister

Death and state funeral of Sir Winston Churchill
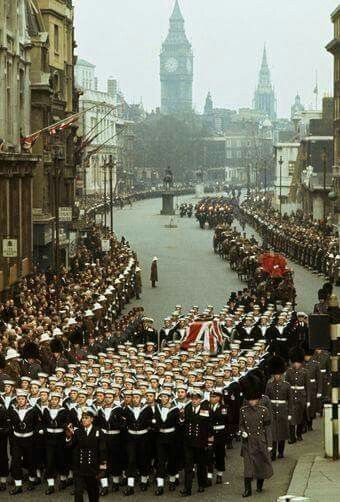
- Funeral procession in London, 1965
- Date: 24 January 1965 (date of death); 30 January 1965 (date of state funeral)
- Location: St Paul's Cathedral, London (official funeral ceremony)
- Cause: Stroke
- Burial: St Martin's Churchyard, Bladon

On 24 January 1965, Winston Churchill, Prime Minister of the United Kingdom during the Second World War, died at the age of 90. His funeral was the first state funeral in the United Kingdom for a non-member of the royal family since Edward Carson's in 1935. The official funeral lasted for four days. Planning for the funeral, known as Operation Hope Not, began after Churchill's stroke in 1953 while in his second term as prime minister. After several revisions due to Churchill's continued survival, the final plan was issued on 26 January 1965, two days after his death.

By decree of Queen Elizabeth II, his body lay in state at Westminster Hall for three days from 26 January. On 30 January, the order of funeral was held at St Paul's Cathedral. From there the body was transported by water along the River Thames to Waterloo station, accompanied by military salutations. In the afternoon he was buried at St Martin's Church, Bladon, the resting place of his ancestors and his brother. Attended by representatives from 120 countries, 6,000 people, and (unusually) by Queen Elizabeth II, the funeral involved more than 1,000 police and security personnel, nine military bands, 18 military battalions, 16 English Electric Lightning fighter jets of the Royal Air Force, a special boat MV Havengore, and a funeral train hauled by his namesake locomotive, the Winston Churchill, homage paid by 321,360 people, and witnessed by over 350 million people. It was the largest state funeral in British history, and was noted "as demonstrating the British genius for public spectacle," and the last state funeral until Queen Elizabeth II's on 19 September 2022.

== Background and funeral plan ==
Sir Winston Churchill is best remembered for leading his country (with the Allies) to victory as prime minister of the United Kingdom during the Second World War. In June 1953, during his second term as prime minister, he had a severe stroke at a dinner party at Downing Street. Unknown to his guests, he collapsed and was left partially paralysed. The family kept the incident secret. Among the few who were informed of the news was Queen Elizabeth II, who had occupied the throne for just a year. She instructed the Duke of Norfolk, who, as Earl Marshal, was in charge of state funerals, to make preparations in the event of Churchill's death that should be "on a scale befitting his position in history". A meticulous and confidential plan titled Operation Hope Not was prepared. Churchill survived the next 12 years, during which necessary modifications were frequently made (mainly because "the pallbearers kept dying", explained Lord Mountbatten). During that period, in 1958, Churchill nearly died from a sudden attack of pneumonia.

The final documents, titled State Funeral of the Late Sir Winston Leonard Spencer Churchill, K.G., O.M., C.H., were issued on 26 January 1965, two days after Churchill's death. The documents dictated the entire course of the funeral down to the minutest detail.

== Death ==
Churchill died on the morning of Sunday 24 January 1965 in his home at 28 Hyde Park Gate, London, exactly 70 years after the death of his father. Since 1949, he had suffered eight strokes. The last was on 15 January 1965, from which he never recovered. After the stroke, he was mostly in a coma; his last words were to his son-in-law Christopher Soames: "I'm so bored with it all." His physician Lord Moran first informed the queen and the prime minister, Harold Wilson, of the death, and then made the announcement at 8:35 am which was given to the press, saying, "Shortly after eight this morning, Sunday, Jan the 24th, Sir Winston Churchill died at his London home. [Signed] Moran."

== Reactions and tributes ==
Leading international tributes were Queen Elizabeth II, Prime Minister Harold Wilson, and Lyndon B. Johnson, the president of the United States.

The Queen immediately sent a letter of condolence to Lady Churchill after hearing Churchill's death, saying:

The whole world is the poorer by the loss of his many-sided genius while the survival of this country and the sister nations of the Commonwealth, in the face of the greatest danger that has ever threatened them, will be a perpetual memorial to his leadership, his vision and indomitable courage.

Wilson announced:

Sir Winston will be mourned all over the world by all who owe so much to him. He is now at peace after a life in which he created history and which will be remembered as long as history is read.

Johnson, hospitalised at Bethesda Naval Hospital with influenza, issued an official statement, saying:

WHEN THERE was darkness in the world, and hope was low in the hearts of men, a generous Providence gave us Winston Churchill.

As long as men tell of that time of terrible danger and of the men who won the victory, the name of Churchill will live...

He is History's child, and what he said and what he did will never die.

He also ordered flags throughout the United States flown at half-staff to pay tribute to America's first honorary citizen through the day of the funeral. This was also the first time that the American flag was flown at half-staff for a foreign leader.

=== Other tributes ===
Other international leaders who joined in the tributes included former British prime ministers Clement Attlee, Anthony Eden, Harold Macmillan, and Alec Douglas-Home, French President Charles de Gaulle, Soviet Premier Alexei Kosygin, former US presidents Harry S. Truman and Dwight D. Eisenhower, and Pope Paul VI. Brazilian President Humberto de Alencar Castelo Branco declared three days of national mourning, with flags flown at half-mast throughout Brazil.

== Authorisation of state funeral ==
The Queen sent a message to the House of Commons concerning the procedures for Churchill's funeral, and was read on 25 January, which ran:

I know that it will be the wish of all my people that the loss which we have sustained by the death of the Right Honourable Sir Winston Churchill, K.G., should be met in the most fitting manner and that they should have an opportunity of expressing their sorrow at the loss and their veneration of the memory of that outstanding man who in war and peace served his country unfailingly for more than fifty years and in the hours of our greatest danger was the inspiring leader who strengthened and supported us all. Confident that I can rely upon the support of my faithful Commons and upon their liberality in making suitable provision for the proper discharge of our debt of gratitude and tribute of national sorrow, I have directed that Sir Winston's body shall lie in state in Westminster Hall and that thereafter the Funeral Service shall be held in the Cathedral Church of St. Paul. – ELIZABETH REGINA

When members of the House met to pay tribute, the prime minister moved the motion that was a request from the Queen regarding the places for lying in state and funeral service, and was resolved as:

That an humble Address be presented to Her Majesty humbly to thank Her Majesty for having given directions for the body of the Rt. Hon. Sir Winston Churchill, K.G., to lie in State in Westminster Hall and for the funeral service to be held in the Cathedral Church of St. Paul and assuring Her Majesty of our cordial aid and concurrence in these measures for expressing the affection and admiration in which the memory of this great man is held by this House and all Her Majesty's faithful subjects.

== Embalming ==
J. H. Kenyon Ltd, of Paddington, London, the funeral directors to the Royal Household since 1928, were tasked with preparing Churchill's remains for the funeral. Desmond Henley, the company's chief embalmer, went to Churchill's Hyde Park Gate home to oversee the process. Churchill's body was embalmed in the same room where he had died. When the process was completed, the remains were dressed in his silk pyjamas and dressing gown and placed back into his bed. Churchill lay in repose in private at his home until 9:00 p.m. Tuesday evening when Kenyon's staff transported his remains to Westminster Hall for public viewing.

== Funeral programme ==
=== Lying in state ===
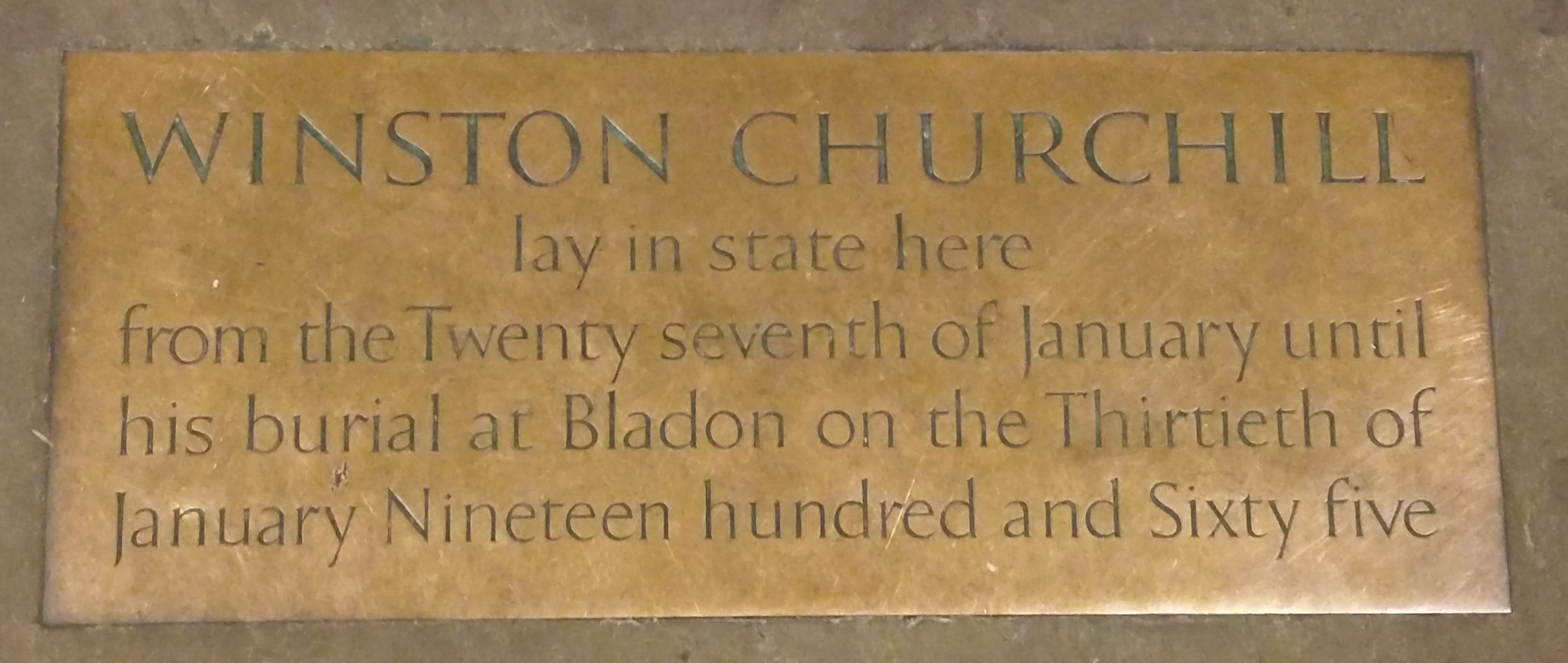
A plaque in Westminster Hall commemorating the lying in state

The funeral started on Tuesday 26 January 1965. By 8:30 p.m. police and security personnel had taken up their positions in what The Daily Telegraph reported as "the most extensive security operation of this sort ever undertaken in England". At 9:15 p.m. Churchill's body was transported from his London home to Westminster Hall for the lying in state. It was led by Cameron Cobbold, 1st Baron Cobbold, the Lord Chamberlain, in the company of family members. He was placed on a catafalque before Lady Churchill and the Earl Marshal. At 9:00 p.m. the first watch was mounted in the hall by the Grenadier and Coldstream Guards. In the subsequent days the Royal Navy, five regiments of foot guards and the Queen's Royal Irish Hussars also took turns.

The lying-in-state lasted from Wednesday 27 January to 6:00 a.m. on 30 January, during which Westminster Hall was kept open for 23 hours daily. An hour was reserved for cleaning. The queue was most times more than one mile long, and the waiting time was about three hours; 321,360 people came to pay their respects.

=== Procession ===
At 9:45 a.m. on Saturday, 30 January, the funeral began with the chiming of Big Ben. The clock was muted for the rest of the day. A ninety-gun salute was fired at Hyde Park to mark the ninety years of Churchill's life. The coffin was carried from the hall by a bearer party of eight guards from the 2nd Battalion Grenadier Guards, placed on a gun carriage and draped with the Union Flag, on which was placed the insignia of the Order of the Garter on a black cushion. The procession started upon a drum beat by the Royal Navy and was then led by the Royal Air Force and the Foot guards. The gun carriage itself was drawn by ninety-eight sailors, with forty more behind holding drag ropes.

Following the gun carriage were Randolph Churchill and his son Winston side by side, followed by male members of the Churchill family and Churchill's private secretary, Anthony Montague Browne, all on foot. Lady Churchill and two daughters followed in the Queen's town coach. As the procession was leaving the New Palace Yard of the Palace of Westminster, a single gunshot was fired at St James's Park. The march processed through Whitehall, Trafalgar Square, the Strand, Fleet Street, and up Ludgate Hill. A marching band consisted of three officers and 96 soldiers of the 2nd Battalion, Scots Guards. Banners of the Danish resistance movements were lowered in respect at the Cenotaph. Altogether 2,500 soldiers and civilians took part in the procession, while four half-companies of soldiers lined the streets. Four majors of the Queen's Royal Irish Hussars were assigned to carry Churchill's medals, orders and decorations. A single gunshot was fired every minute until they arrived at St Paul's.

=== Entry to St Paul's Cathedral ===
The coffin arrived at St Paul's at 10.45 a.m. The pallbearers picked up the coffin from the gun carriage at the west end of the cathedral, and carried it up the 24 steps leading to the entrance. The main pallbearers were eight soldiers of the Grenadier Guards.

There were twelve honorary pallbearers walking in front of the main pallbearers, including Louis Mountbatten, 1st Earl Mountbatten of Burma, the Prime Minister of Australia, Robert Menzies, and the former British Prime Ministers Clement Attlee, Anthony Eden and Harold Macmillan. Aged 82, Attlee was frail with ill-health but insisted he be the pallbearer as Churchill had asked him to do the honour. Walking just in front of the main pallbearers, he stumbled on the steps, making the pallbearers lose their balance, almost dropping the coffin, only being saved by two soldiers, "pushers", from the back.

=== Order of service ===
The service began as the coffin was laid in St Paul's Cathedral. With officials from more than 112 countries attending, 3,500 people attended the service, and it was the largest gathering of dignitaries in history until the 1980 funeral of Josip Broz Tito, the 2005 funeral of Pope John Paul II and the 2013 funeral of Nelson Mandela. Guests included the French president Charles de Gaulle, the Canadian prime minister Lester B. Pearson, the prime minister of Rhodesia Ian Smith, former US president Dwight D. Eisenhower, many other past and present heads of state and government, and members of multiple royal families. Churchill had expressly objected to inviting de Gaulle as he believed, although they were allies in the war, he was anti-British and was pleaded with by the Duke of Norfolk on the ground of political amnesty; to which Churchill agreed on the condition that London Waterloo station be used instead of Paddington, as planned. Sir Robert Menzies, then the longest-serving Commonwealth Prime Minister, and Eisenhower, both of whom had known Churchill well in wartime, paid tribute on the BBC's broadcast of the funeral. Churchill's favourite hymns were sung, including "Fight the Good Fight", "He Who Would Valiant Be" and "Battle Hymn of the Republic". Choral music was William Croft's Funeral Sentences sung during the entry procession, and the Kontakion of the Departed, "Give rest, O Christ, to thy servant with thy Saints". "Battle Hymn of the Republic" paid tribute to Churchill's American roots, including his honorary US citizenship, his close relationship with the US, particularly his friendship with US president Franklin D. Roosevelt, and his American-born mother. The other two recalled his personality and career.

The (cavalry) Last Post was played by Trumpet Corporal Peter Wilson of the Life Guards with Reveille played by Trumpeter Basil King of the Queen's Royal Irish Hussars. As the service was over at one o'clock, Handel's "Dead March" was played on the organ while the pallbearers were getting ready. The congregation sang "Our God, Our Help in Ages Past" as the coffin was carried out through the Great West Doors.

Menzies and Eisenhower gave their tributes after the funeral, speaking from the cathedral's crypt. Menzies recited:

In the whole of recorded history this [the Second World War] was, I believe, the one occasion when one man, with one soaring imagination, with one fire burning in him, and with one unrivalled capacity for conveying it to others, won a crucial victory not only for the Forces (for there were many heroes in those days) but for the spirit of human freedom. And so, on this day, we thank him, and we thank God for him.

Eisenhower gave his tribute after Menzies:

With no thought of the length of time he might be permitted on earth, he was concerned only with the quality of the service he could render to his nation and to humanity. Though he had no fear of death, he coveted always the opportunity to continue that service. Among all the things so written or spoken, there will ring out through the entire century one incontestable refrain: Here was a champion of freedom.

Queen Elizabeth II broke certain royal protocols at Churchill's funeral. Firstly, it was a common royal etiquette for the monarch to not attend funeral service outside of the royal family. Secondly, she not only attended the service but was among the first officials to arrive at St Paul's, making her presence even before the coffin and Churchill family arrived. It is a royal custom in any event that the monarch is always the last to arrive. Additionally, it is a royal convention that the monarch is also the first to exit or end an ongoing event. As the funeral service was over, Queen Elizabeth II followed the Churchill family out of the cathedral. To these unusual deeds by Queen Elizabeth II, Nicholas Soames commented: "It is absolutely exceptional if not unique for the Queen to grant precedence to anyone. For her to arrive before the coffin and before my grandfather was a beautiful and very touching gesture." There was a historical precedent however; Queen Elizabeth II's grandfather, George V, had attended the state funeral of Lord Roberts in 1914 and similarly forgone his royal privileges for the occasion.

=== St Paul's to Bladon ===
==== Procession to Tower Pier ====
After the church service, Churchill's coffin was replaced on the gun carriage by a bearer party from the Grenadier Guards and proceeded to the Tower of London, the journey lasting 18 minutes. Arriving at Tower Hill the procession was led by 60 pipers from the Scots Guards, the Royal Inniskilling Fusiliers and the King's Own Scottish Borderers, playing Scottish laments, and then a Royal Marines band played Sunset on Tower Wharf. The Honourable Artillery Company fired a 19-gun salute, acknowledging Churchill's positions (as head of government and Lord Warden of the Cinque Ports). The procession moved to Tower Pier, where the coffin was taken on board the MV Havengore.

==== On the River Thames ====
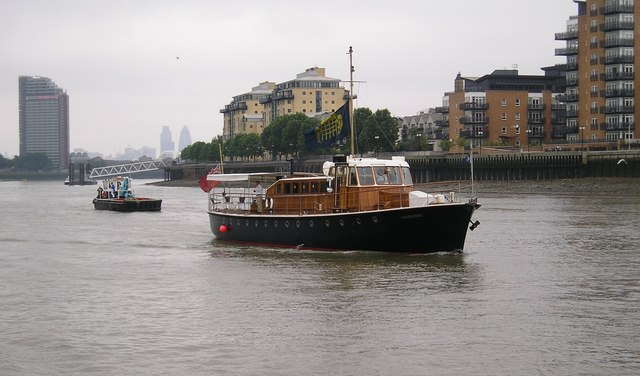
MV Havengore which carried the coffin from Tower Pier to Waterloo station

Aboard MV Havengore, naval ratings 'piped the side' and the Royal Marine band played the musical salute Rule, Britannia! to the former First Lord of the Admiralty. Sixteen Royal Air Force English Electric Lightning fighter jets flew-past in formation as the boat sailed.

As the coffin passed up the River Thames, more than 36 dockers lowered their crane jibs in a salute on the south side of the bank. It was not part of the plan and was initially disapproved by New Scotland Yard as an unnecessary private tribute. The cranes were under the Hay's Wharf (now Hay's Galleria) and the homage was praised as a gesture of respect in an unrehearsed and spontaneous action.

Nicholas Soames, grandson of Churchill, remarked this unexpected activity as one that "undid us all". But when Jeremy Paxman aired his BBC documentary Churchill: A Nation's Farewell in 2015, he created a controversy. In it, Paxman interviewed one of the surviving dockers John Lynch, who claimed that the workers were paid to show up for work and did the gesture only because they were paid to do so as it was a Saturday, their day off. Lynch further went on to say that the dockers hated Churchill. In response, David Freeman reported that way back in 1965, David Burnett, the then managing director of Hay's Wharf, had publicly revealed that the gesture was voluntary. Talking to the Daily Mail, Burnett had stated: "We thought we should add our own little tribute to Sir Winston. The dock workers concerned immediately agreed to give up their time off... Our men have not asked for any overtime. They will be paid something to cover their expenses". Rodney J. Croft also described in his 2014 book Churchill's Final Farewell that the crane drivers voluntarily did the job "without any resort to asking for overtime pay".

==== Festival Pier to Waterloo Station ====
From the MV Havengore, the coffin was borne to a black Austin Princess hearse at Festival Pier by non-commissioned soldiers of the Queen's Royal Irish Hussars in No. 1 Dress Uniform. The hearse was escorted only by a large limousine for the Churchill family.

==== Funeral train ====
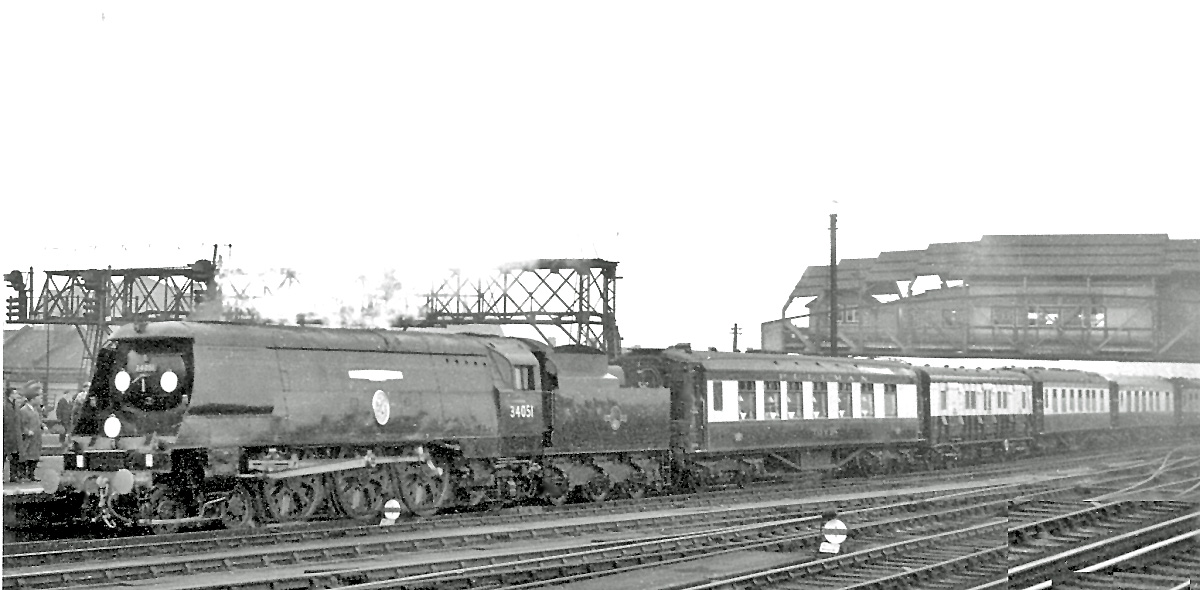
Sir Winston Churchill's funeral train passing Clapham Junction

The coffin arrived at Waterloo Station at 1:23 p.m. and was picked up by ten commissioned officers from the Queen's Royal Irish hussars in No 1 Dress uniform and was placed in a specially prepared funeral train, the locomotive of which was named Winston Churchill that was to carry it to the final destination, Hanborough station in Oxfordshire. The hearse van, No. S2464S, had been set aside in 1962 specifically for the funeral train. In the fields along the route, and at the stations through which the train passed, thousands stood in silence to pay their last respects.

==== Burial at Bladon ====
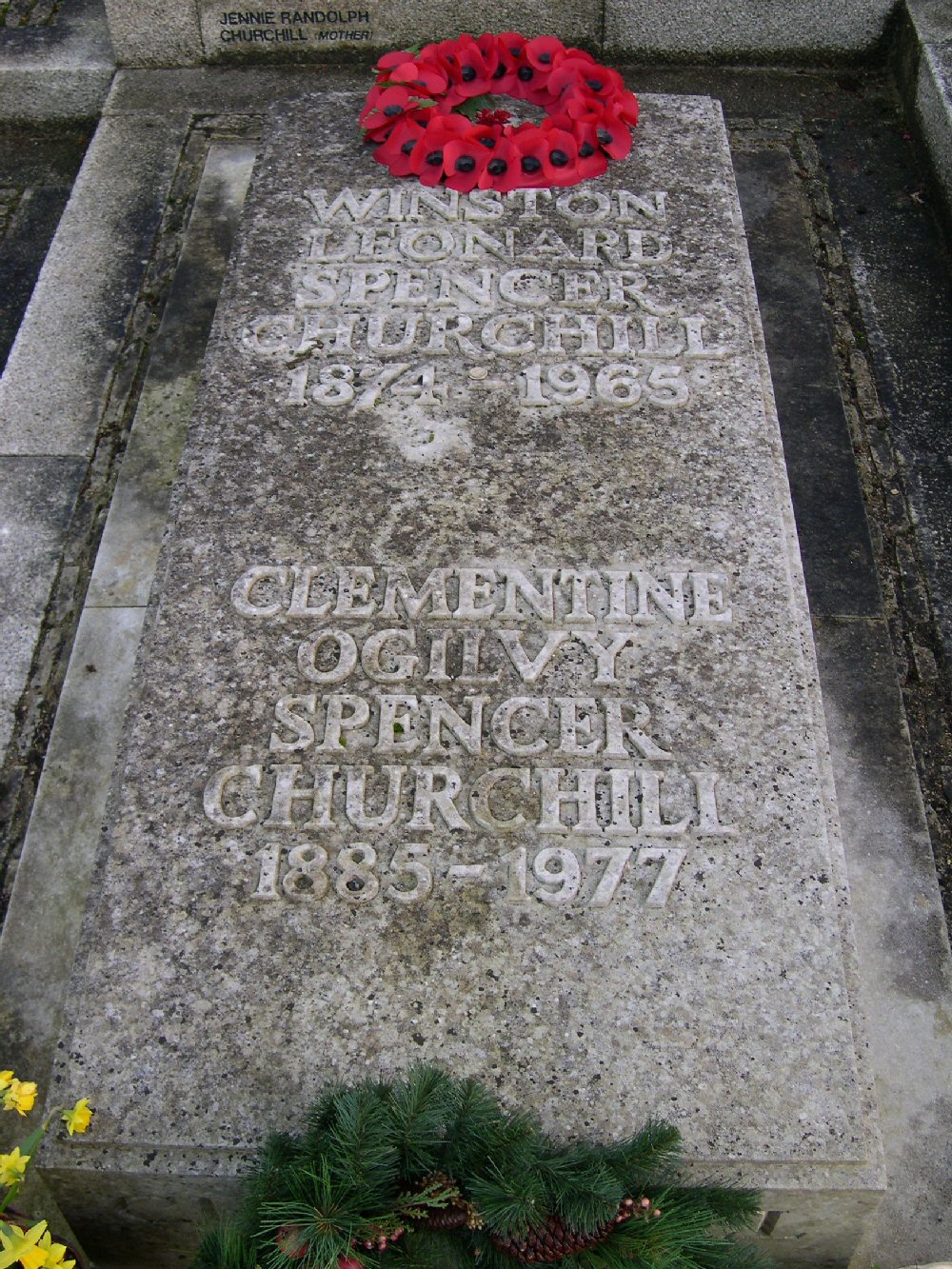
The grave of Sir Winston and Lady Clementine Churchill at St Martin's Church, Bladon in Oxfordshire

At Bladon, the coffin was carried to St Martin's Churchyard by the officer bearer party of the Queen's Royal Irish Hussars and interred in a private family ceremony. He was laid in a grave near to his parents and his brother.

== Observances outside of Britain ==
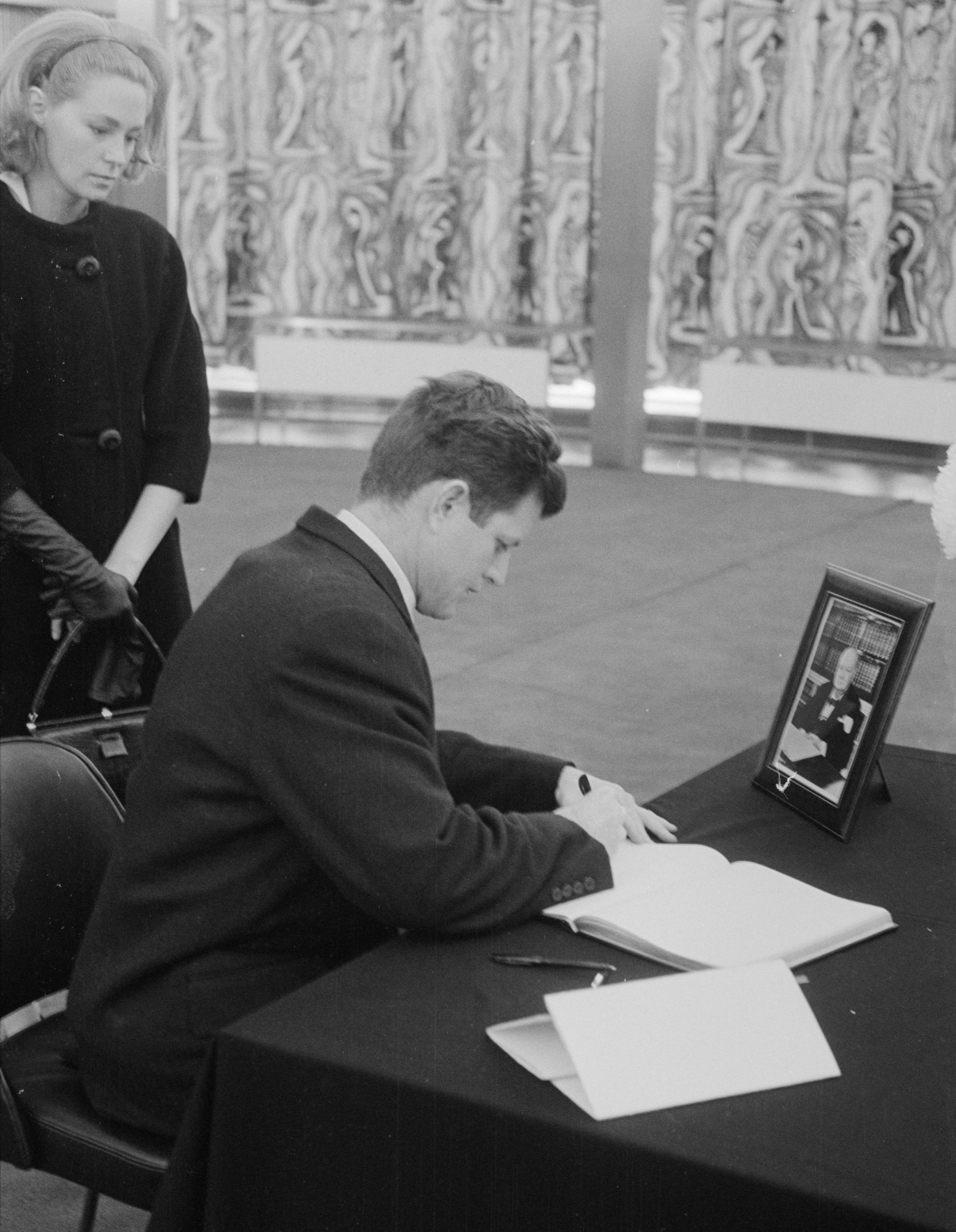
A man signing a condolence book for Churchill at the British Embassy in Washington D.C.

There were many memorial services taking place for Churchill outside of Britain during the funeral. For example, in the United States, a memorial service for Churchill took place at FDR's grave at his home in Hyde Park, New York to mark the anniversary of Roosevelt's birth. Those attending the service heard speakers talk about the coincidence of the date in the records of two leaders who shared history. West Point Superintendent Major General James Lampert laid a wreath from President Johnson to pay tribute to both FDR and Churchill.

== Dignitaries ==
Churchill's funeral was the largest gathering of international leaders during the 1960s — and, at that time, in history. Representatives from 112 countries and many organisations attended, including 5 kings, 2 queens, 1 emperor, 1 grand duke, 2 queen consorts, 15 presidents, 14 prime ministers and 10 former leaders. After the funeral, Queen Elizabeth II made another unprecedented gesture in hosting a buffet lunch for all the dignitaries.

=== British royal family ===
- The Queen and the Duke of Edinburgh
  - The Prince of Wales
- Queen Elizabeth the Queen Mother
  - Princess Margaret and the Earl of Snowdon
- The Princess Royal
- The Duke and Duchess of Gloucester
  - Prince William of Gloucester
  - Prince Richard of Gloucester
- Princess Marina, Duchess of Kent
  - The Duke and Duchess of Kent
  - Princess Alexandra and Angus Ogilvy
  - Prince Michael of Kent

=== Other guests ===
- Josef Klaus, Chancellor of Austria
- Sir Robert Menzies, Prime Minister of Australia
- (Belgium) Baudouin, King of the Belgians, accompanied by Paul Henri Spaak, Foreign Minister
- Lester B. Pearson, Prime Minister of Canada
- (Commonwealth of Nations) Arnold Smith, Commonwealth Secretary-General
- (Republic of Ireland) Frank Aiken, Minister for External Affairs of Ireland
- George Borg Olivier, Prime Minister of Malta
- Keith Holyoake, Prime Minister of New Zealand
- Frederik IX, King of Denmark and Jens Otto Krag, Prime Minister of Denmark
- Olav V, King of Norway and Einar Gerhardsen, Prime Minister of Norway
- Ahti K. Karjalainen, Minister for Foreign Affairs of Finland
- Ludwig Erhard, Chancellor of West Germany
- (Greece) Constantine II, King of the Hellenes
- Ásgeir Ásgeirsson, President of Iceland
- Juliana, Queen of the Netherlands and Bernhard, Prince Consort of the Netherlands, accompanied by Joseph Luns, Foreign Minister
- Sardar Swaran Singh, Foreign Minister of India
- Zulfikar Ali Bhutto, Foreign Minister of Pakistan
- Jean, Grand Duke of Luxembourg
- Zalman Shazar, President of Israel
- Tage Erlander, Prime Minister of Sweden, accompanied by Prince Bertil
- Prince Hassan of Jordan
- Ian Smith, Prime Minister of Rhodesia
- Nobusuke Kishi, former Prime Minister of Japan
- (South Korea) Chung Il Kwon, former Prime Minister of Korea
- Miguel Ángel Zavala Ortiz, Foreign Minister of Argentina
- (Democratic Republic of the Congo) Moise Tshombe, Prime Minister of Congo
- Luis Giannattasio, President of Uruguay

=== Delegations ===
Three countries were permitted to send delegations:

France

- Charles de Gaulle, President
- Admiral Georges Cabanier, Naval Chief of Staff
- Geoffroy Chodron de Courcel, Ambassador to the United Kingdom

Soviet Union

- Konstantin Rudnev, Deputy Premier
- Marshal of the Soviet Union Ivan Konev, commander of the Group of Soviet Forces in Germany

United States

- Earl Warren, Chief Justice
- David K. E. Bruce, Ambassador to the United Kingdom
- Lloyd Hand, Chief of Protocol
- W. Averell Harriman, Under Secretary of State
- Dwight D. Eisenhower, former president and General of the Army retired
- Ten senators, including:
  - J. William Fulbright, Chairman of the Foreign Relations Committee
  - Bourke Hickenlooper, ranking Republican, Foreign Relations Committee
  - Henry M. Jackson

The chief members of the delegation were initially Warren, Secretary of State Dean Rusk, and Bruce. However, while in London, Rusk became ill and so did not attend, resulting in Hand becoming a chief representative.

=== Prominent absences ===
Irish President Éamon de Valera was not invited, being an outspoken antagonist of Churchill, particularly for the latter's involvement in the partition of Ireland. Upon hearing of the death, he praised Churchill as "a great Englishman", while adding that he had also been "a dangerous adversary" for Ireland.

US President Lyndon Johnson did not attend upon the advice of his doctors after hospitalisation for influenza. However, his decision not to send Vice President Hubert Humphrey for no particular reason provoked sharp criticism in newspapers in the US, Britain, and elsewhere abroad. The White House press corps repeatedly questioned Press Secretary George Reedy for an explanation of the absence. Johnson later said during a press conference that not sending Humphrey was a "mistake".

== Media coverage ==
=== News of death ===
The BBC relayed the news of the death at 9:00 a.m. and continued playing Symphony No. 5 by Beethoven, the opening theme with three short notes and a long note that indicated the letter "V" in Morse code to symbolise Churchill's iconic wartime gesture, two fingers held aloft to show "V" for victory.

=== Coverage of state funeral ===
The funeral was watched by 25 million people in the United Kingdom; it was not, however, broadcast live in Ireland, which, in 1965, had no daytime television (the single Irish network, RTÉ, broadcast only in the evening, between 5:30 p.m. and 11:30 p.m. There were 350 million viewers internationally, making it a record for a television event at the time.

In Britain, the funeral was broadcast live on BBC, presented by Richard Dimbleby, and on ITV with Brian Connell doing the commentary. This was the last state occasion presented by Dimbleby before his death from cancer in December of the same year.

In North America, which is five to eight hours behind Greenwich Mean Time, the funeral occurred during the time usually taken up by network breakfast television programmes. However, then, the only such programme in the United States was NBC Today, which did not broadcast on Saturdays. Although the funeral took place in the early morning hours in North America, the audience in the United States was larger than JFK's fourteen months earlier. NBC had the highest ratings among the three networks at the time (ABC, CBS, and NBC) for their live coverage, with Chet Huntley, David Brinkley, and Merrill Mueller (himself a former NBC London bureau chief) presenting the coverage live from London. The networks also carried highlights of the funeral in the evening hours.

== Aftermath ==
As Lady Churchill was retiring to bed she said to her daughter Mary Soames, "It wasn't a funeral, Mary – it was a triumph".

The Scots Guards Battalion Digest reported, stating, "without a doubt the State Funeral of 30 January was the most moving parade that the majority of the battalion had ever taken part in or observed. Perfect timing, detailed rehearsal and greater dignity all combined to make it a proud and wonderful occasion".

The Observer reported on 31 January, saying, "This was the last time that London would be the capital of the world. This was an act of mourning for the imperial past. This marked the final act in Britain's greatness... It was a triumph. It was a celebration of a great thing that we did in the past".

Within a week, more than 100,000 people had visited the grave. In 1998, Churchill's tombstone had to be replaced due to the large number of visitors over the years having eroded it and its surrounding area. A new stone was dedicated in 1998 in a ceremony attended by members of the Spencer-Churchill family.

De Gaulle commented: "Now Britain is no longer a great power."

== See also ==
- Death and funeral of Margaret Thatcher
- Death and state funeral of Elizabeth II
