= Bladon =

Village in Oxfordshire, England

Coordinates: 51.832°N 1.351°W

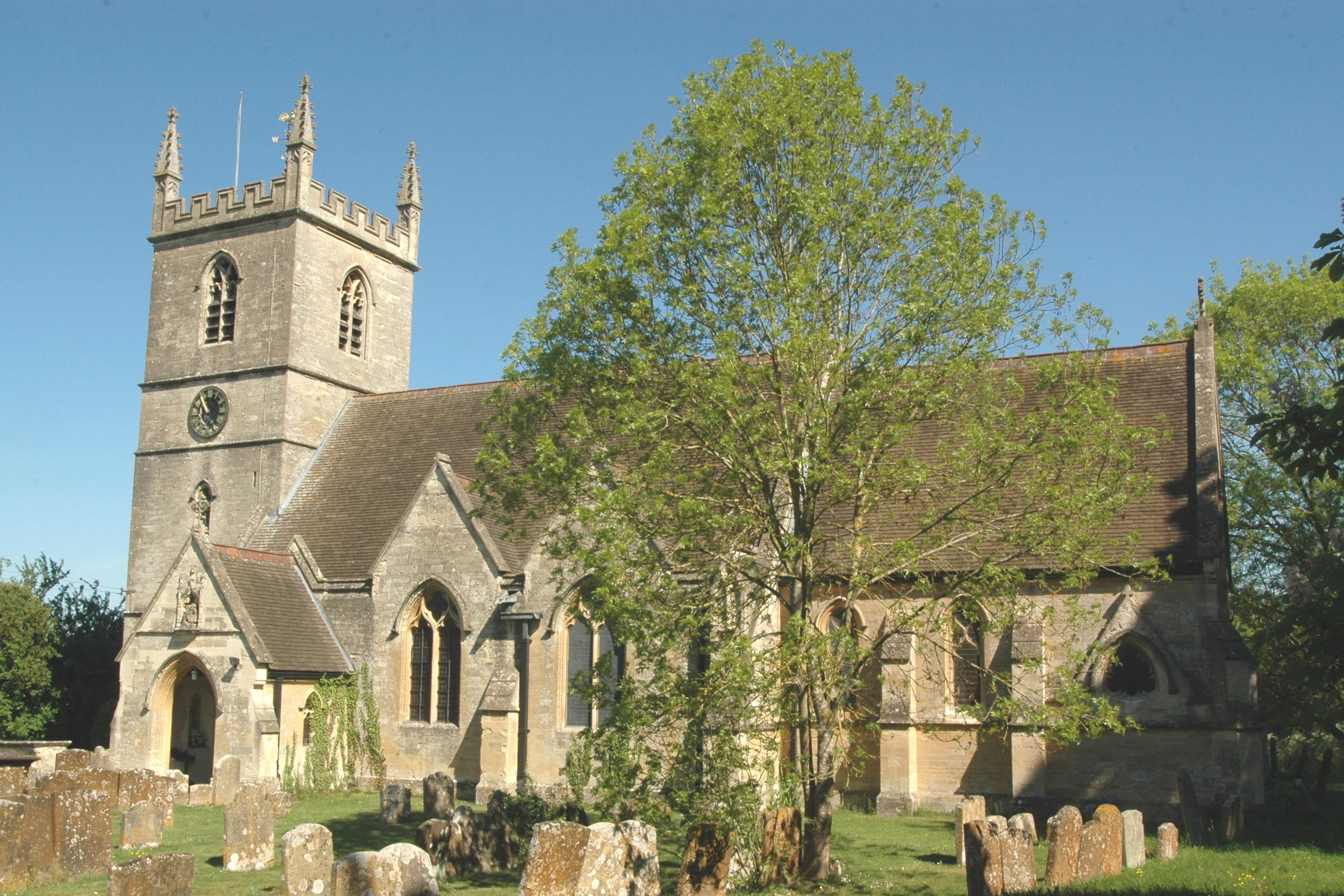
- St. Martin's parish church

- Location within Oxfordshire
- Population: 898 (2011 Census)
- OS grid reference: SP4414
- Civil parish: Bladon
- District: West Oxfordshire
- Shire county: Oxfordshire
- Region: South East
- Country: England
- Sovereign state: United Kingdom
- Post town: Woodstock
- Postcode district: OX20
- Dialling code: 01993
- Police: Thames Valley
- Fire: Oxfordshire
- Ambulance: South Central
- UK Parliament: Bicester and Woodstock
- Website: Bladon Parish Council

Bladon is a village and civil parish on the River Glyme about 6 1/2 miles (10.5 km) northwest of Oxford, Oxfordshire, England. It is where Sir Winston Churchill is buried. The 2011 Census recorded the parish's population as 898.

== Places of worship ==
=== St Martin's Church ===
St Martin's Church was originally 11th or 12th century, and its south porch had a Norman doorway. However, the old church was demolished in 1802 and a new building completed in 1804. This in turn was completely rebuilt in 1891 to designs by the Gothic Revival architect A.W. Blomfield.

The parish of St Martin's includes Blenheim Palace, the family seat of the Duke of Marlborough. Most members of the Spencer-Churchill family are buried in St Martin's parish churchyard at Bladon; only the Dukes and Duchesses are interred in the Blenheim Palace chapel. Blenheim Palace is also the birthplace of Winston Churchill, who was Prime Minister of the United Kingdom 1940–45 and again 1951–55. Like his parents, he was buried in St. Martin's parish churchyard after his death, in 1965; his wife Clementine was buried in the same grave after her death 12 years later.

=== Methodist church ===
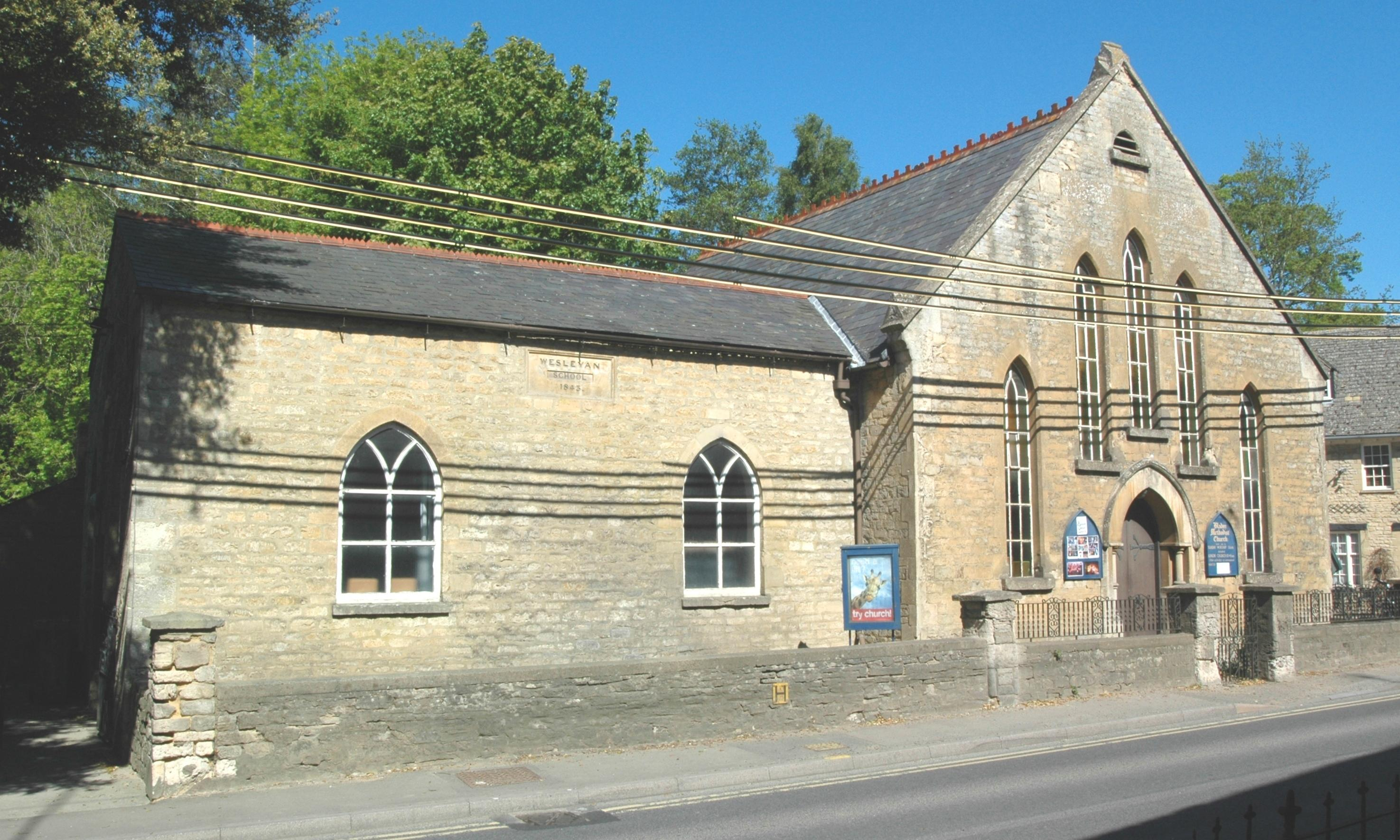
Bladon Methodist Church, built in 1877

A Methodist congregation was established in Bladon by 1820 and built its first chapel in 1843. In 1877, a new chapel was built copying the Early English style of the 13th century. It is now Bladon Methodist Church and belongs to the Oxford Methodist Circuit.

== School ==
In 1858 the Duchess of Marlborough, wife of the 7th Duke, provided a new Gothic Revival building to found a school in Bladon. The building was enlarged in 1890. It was known as the Duchess of Marlborough's school, but in 1937 its ownership was transferred from the Duchy of Marlborough to Bladon parochial church council. In 1940 it was reorganised as a junior school, with most senior pupils from Bladon thereafter going to secondary school in Woodstock. Since 1954 the school has been a Church of England primary school.

== Amenities ==
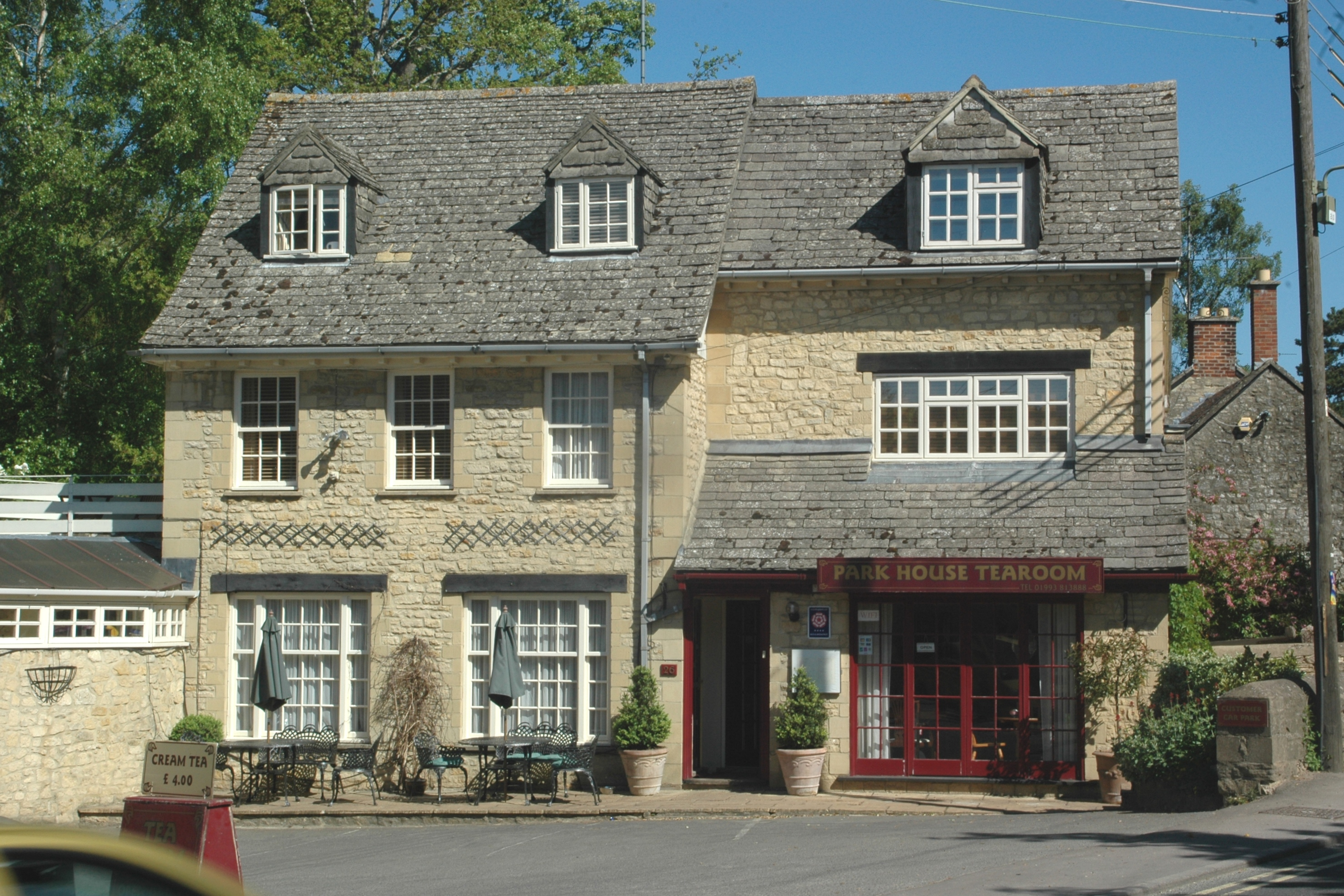
Bladon Tea Room

Bladon has one public house, the White House, which is now owned by the community.

Stagecoach West route S7 serves Bladon seven days a week. Buses run twice an hour to Witney via Long Hanborough in one direction, and to Oxford via Woodstock, Kidlington, and Oxford Parkway in the other.

== Sources ==
- Crossley, Alan; Elrington, (CR (eds.)) (1990). A History of the County of Oxford. Victoria County History. Vol. 12: Wootton Hundred (South) including Woodstock. London: Oxford University Press for the Institute of Historical Research. pp. 14–36. ISBN 978-0-19722-774-9.
- Sherwood, Jennifer; Pevsner, Nikolaus (1974). Oxfordshire. The Buildings of England. Harmondsworth: Penguin Books. p. 459. ISBN 0-14-071045-0.
