= MV Havengore =

1956 hydrographic survey launch

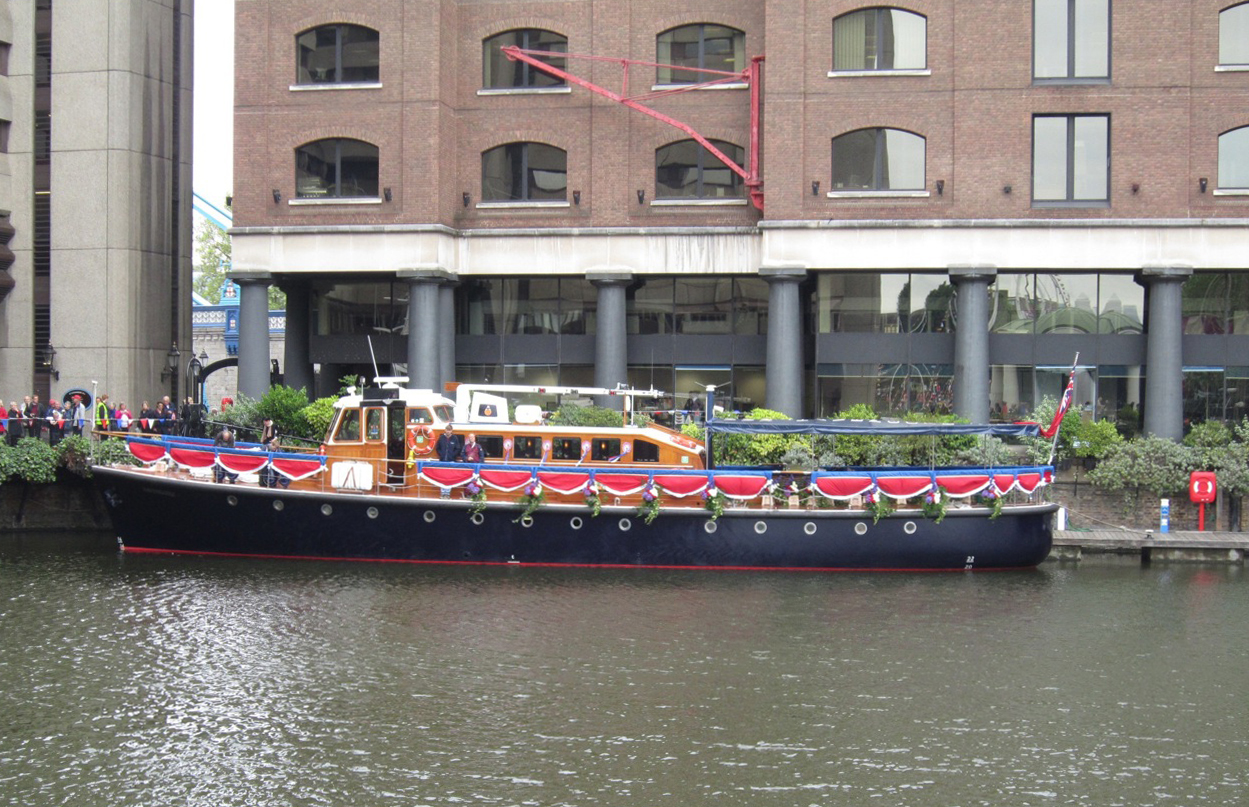
- Havengore decorated for the Thames Diamond Jubilee Pageant

History

United Kingdom
- Name: Havengore (2nd of that name)
- Namesake: Havengore Island, a low-lying marshy island off the coast of Essex.
- Owner: Christopher Ryland
- Operator: Venues of Distinction
- Ordered: 1954
- Builder: Tough Brothers, Teddington
- Launched: 1956
- Sponsored by: Port of London Authority
- Commissioned: 4 February 1956
- Recommissioned: 1997
- Decommissioned: 1995
- Maiden voyage: 1 February 1956
- Out of service: 1995
- Reclassified: 2006
- Home port: London
- Identification: MHQK
- Motto: "Walk always in the Ranks of Honor"
- Nickname(s): 'H'
- Honours and awards: Bearer of Sir Winston Churchill during his State Funeral in 1965
- Status: Operational
- Badge: A demi-bulldog affronty vested in a Union Flag holding a twisted rope coil with an azure background, two sea-lions combatant, representing the PLA, supporting a "V" for Victory.

General characteristics
- Class & type: Class V Passenger ship; ex survey ship
- Tonnage: 89.19 tons gross, 46.31 registered
- Length: 25.81 m (84.7 ft)
- Beam: 4.95 m (16.2 ft)
- Draft: 1.90 m (6.2 ft)
- Installed power: Twin Gardner 8L3 Diesels delivering 304 h.p. at 900 r.p.m.
- Speed: 12.29 knots
- Capacity: 40 passengers
- Crew: up to 10

Havengore is a former hydrographic survey launch, originally launched in 1956 for service with the Port of London Authority (PLA). After her withdrawal from service and sale in 1995, she was re-registered as a passenger vessel for up to 40 passengers. Based on the River Thames, Havengore has also served as a ceremonial vessel. She is best known for carrying the body of Sir Winston Churchill as part of his state funeral in 1965.

Havengore was named after Havengore Island, a low-lying marshy island off the coast of Essex. The derivation of the word Havengore is Old English, 'haefen' meaning an anchorage and 'gor' meaning muddy. The adjoining Havengore Creek marked the northern end of the PLA's jurisdiction prior to 1964, when it was extended to include the whole of the Thames Estuary. By convention many PLA vessels are named after features of the River Thames.

== History ==
=== Construction ===
Havengore was commissioned by the Port of London Authority (PLA) in 1954 to replace its former survey vessel the Shorne Meade. Built by Tough Brothers of Teddington, she is of double diagonal construction in teak over a framework of English oak. The National Physical Laboratory helped design and test her twin counter-rotating propellers and underwater fittings, while Decca Radar oversaw trials of her survey systems. She was launched in 1956.

=== 1956-1995: Port of London Authority ===
Havengore entered service with the PLA on 4 February 1956. As the PLA's hydrographic survey vessel, she was responsible for recording changes to the bed of the River Thames and Thames Estuary. She was the first survey vessel in the UK to install a computer to record survey data, using punched tape; replacement Unix workstations were installed in 1989. After becoming the longest-serving PLA vessel, she performed her last hydrographic work in 1995, when she was withdrawn from service and sold.

=== 1995-2024: Private ownership ===
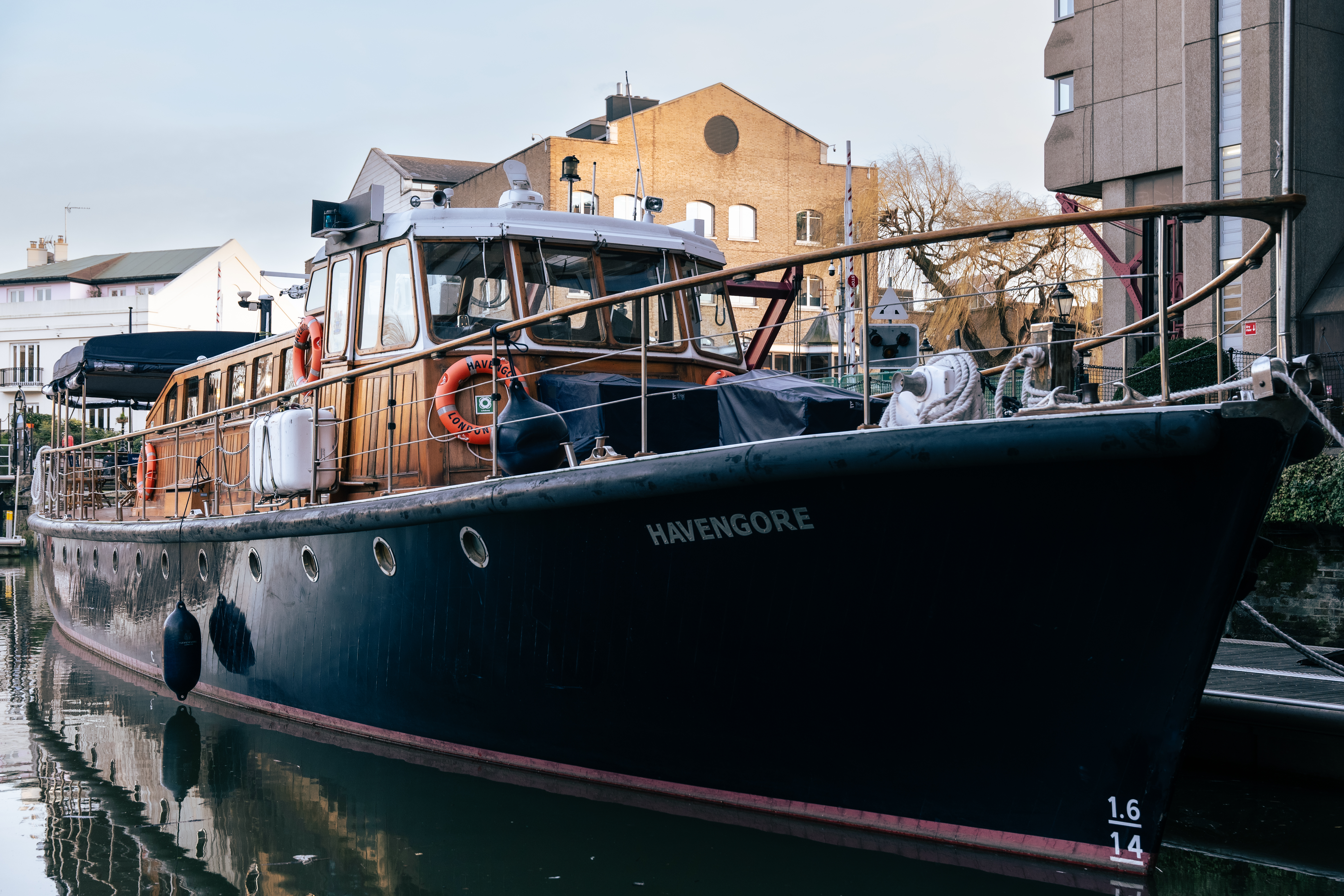

After changing hands in 1995, Havengore was restored and refitted at the Chatham Historic Dockyard. Subsequently, she was used by the Havengore Education and Leadership Mission (HELM) to provide excursions for underprivileged children on the River Medway. Changing hands again in 2006, three further phases of restoration - including the reuse of parts from a 0-4-0 diesel locomotive - have ensured that she remains fully operational in compliance with MCA regulations, while respecting her historic fabric.

Havengore participated in the river pageant held to mark the 200th anniversary of the Battle of Trafalgar and has taken part in services marking Armistice Day and Armed Forces Day. Moored at St Katharine Docks, Havengore currently undertakes a mixed programme of public service and charitable events and is also available for corporate hospitality purposes.

== Churchill funeral ==
On 30 January 1965 Havengore carried Sir Winston Churchill on his last journey by water along the River Thames from Tower Pier to Festival Pier during his state funeral. On her journey along the Thames, Havengore was saluted by a flypast of 16 English Electric Lightning fighter jets, and dock cranes were bowed as she passed. This event was broadcast live to an estimated worldwide audience of 350 million viewers, one in ten of the then world population. Archive newsreel footage is available via the BBC website. Havengore carries a commemorative plaque presented by the International Churchill Society inscribed with the words of the BBC broadcaster that day, Richard Dimbleby: 'And so Havengore sails into history ... not even the Golden Hind had borne so great a man'.

== Queen Elizabeth ==
Havengore participated in the river pageant held to mark the Queen's Silver Jubilee in 1977.

On 17 May 2012 it was announced that the Havengore had been selected to carry members of the Royal Family as part of Queen Elizabeth II's Diamond Jubilee celebrations in a flotilla of over a thousand vessels during the Thames pageant on 3 June 2012. Members of the Royal Family who embarked on the Havengore for the Thames pageant were The Duke of York, Princess Beatrice, Princess Eugenie, The Earl and Countess of Wessex, The Duke and Duchess of Gloucester, and Prince and Princess Michael of Kent.

The craft also participated in observances on the Thames marking Queen Elizabeth's surpassing of Queen Victoria as the longest-reigning British monarch on 9 September 2015.

== See also ==
- Hydrography
- The Thames Barge Driving Race
- Cabinet War Rooms - where there is archive footage of the state funeral of Sir Winston Churchill
- Bletchley Park Museum - where there are a number of artefacts relating to Havengore including a model of the ship as she was on the day of the state funeral. These are in the museum's Churchill Collection
- National Register of Historic Vessels - Certificate No. 1819
