= Churchill (disambiguation) =

Winston Churchill (1874–1965) was a British statesman who led the United Kingdom and British Empire during the Second World War.

Churchill may also refer to:

== Arts and entertainment ==
=== Film and television ===
- The Churchills (TV series), a Channel 4 documentary written and presented by David Starkey
- Churchill (film), a 2017 biographical film

=== Music ===
- Churchill (band), an American rock band
- The Churchills (Israeli band)
- The Churchills (American band)

== Businesses ==
- Churchill Insurance, an insurance company based in the UK
- The Churchill Machine Tool Company, British machine tools manufacturer and importer

== Hospitality ==
- Churchill Hotel (Washington, D.C.), a hotel in Washington, D.C., United States
- Churchills, Bolton, a listed former pub in Greater Manchester, England
- The Churchill, Manchester, a listed pub in Greater Manchester, England
- The Churchill Arms, a pub in Notting Hill, London, England
- The Churchill Hotel, York, a listed building in North Yorkshire, England
- Hyatt Regency London – The Churchill, a hotel on Portman Square, England

== Military ==
- Churchill tank, a British Second World War tank
- HMS Churchill (I45), a Second World War destroyer
- HMS Churchill (S46), a nuclear submarine
  - Churchill-class submarine
- CFS Churchill, a Canadian Forces base in Churchill, Manitoba, Canada
- USS Winston S. Churchill, a destroyer of the United States Navy

== People ==
- Churchill (surname), including a list of people with the name
- Churchill, the family name of the Duke of Marlborough
- Churchill Babington (1821–1889), English classical scholar, archaeologist and naturalist
- Churchill (comedian), stage name of Daniel Ndambuki (born 1977), Kenyan comedian
- Yitzhak Klepter (1950–2022), Israeli musician often referred to by his nickname "Churchill"

== Places ==
=== Antarctica ===
- Churchill Mountains, Antarctica

=== Australia ===
- Churchill, Queensland, a suburb of Ipswich
- Churchill, Victoria, a town

=== Canada ===
- Churchill, Manitoba, a port town in northern Manitoba
  - Churchill (provincial electoral district)
- Churchill, former name of Churchill—Keewatinook Aski federal electoral district, Manitoba
- Churchill, Prince Edward Island, a community
- Churchill, Simcoe County, Ontario, a community of the town of Innisfil
- Churchill, Wellington County, Ontario, a community of the town of Erin

=== Ireland ===
- Churchill, County Donegal, a village in Ireland

=== United Kingdom ===
- Churchill, East Devon, a hamlet in All Saints parish
- Churchill, North Devon, a hamlet near East Down
- Churchill, Oxfordshire, a village and civil parish
- Churchill, Somerset, a village and civil parish
- Churchill, Wychavon, Worcestershire, near Worcester, sometimes called Churchill in Oswaldslow
- Churchill, Wyre Forest, a village near Kidderminster sometimes called Churchill in Halfshire

=== United States ===
- Churchill, Holyoke, Massachusetts, a neighborhood in Holyoke
- Churchill, Chippewa County, Minnesota, an unincorporated community
- Churchill, Renville County, Minnesota, an unincorporated community
- Churchill, Montana
- Churchill, Ohio, a census-designated place
- Churchill, Pennsylvania, a borough
- Churchill Township, Michigan
- Mount Churchill, Alaska, a volcano

== Schools ==
- Churchill Academy and Sixth Form, North Somerset, England
- Churchill College, Cambridge, a constituent college of the University of Cambridge, England
- Churchill School (disambiguation)
- Winston Churchill School (disambiguation)

== Transportation ==
- TCDD 45151 Class or Churchills, a class of steam locomotives
- Churchill railway station, Churchill, County Donegal, Ireland
- Churchill station (Edmonton), Alberta, Canada
- Churchill station (Manitoba), Canada

== Other uses ==
- Churchill (cocktail)
- Churchill (horse) (born 2014), an Irish-bred racehorse
- Churchill (snow cone), a dessert from Costa Rica
- Churchill, a species of electric fish in the genus Petrocephalus
- Churchill, a type of parejo cigar
- Churchill, the polar bear depicted on the Canadian toonie

== See also ==
=== Disambiguation ===
- Church Hill (disambiguation)
- Churchill Bust (disambiguation)
- Churchill County (disambiguation)
- Churchill Downs (disambiguation)
- Churchill Falls (disambiguation)
- Churchill Island (disambiguation)
- Churchill Lake (disambiguation)
- Churchill Museum (disambiguation)
- Churchill Park (disambiguation)
- Churchill River (disambiguation)
- Churchill Square (disambiguation)

=== Similar sounding ===
- Cherchell, a seaport in Algeria
