= Church Hill =

Church Hill may refer to:

== Australia ==
- Church Hill, Sydney

== Ireland ==
- Churchill, County Donegal

== New Zealand ==
- Church Hill, Nelson

== United Kingdom ==
- Church Hill, Derbyshire, England
- Church Hill, Staffordshire, England
- Church Hill, Northumberland, England
- Church Hill, West Midlands, England
- Church Hill, West Sussex, England
- Church Hill, Worcestershire, England
- Church Hill, County Tyrone, a townland in County Tyrone, Northern Ireland
- Church Hill, Edinburgh, Scotland
- Church Hill, Pembrokeshire, a location in Wales

== United States ==
- Church Hill, Alabama
- Church Hill, Georgia
- Church Hill, Maryland
- Church Hill, Mississippi
- Church Hill, Astoria, Oregon, a district of Astoria, Oregon and also known as the Shively–McClure Historic District
- Church Hill, Pennsylvania, in Mifflin County
- Church Hill, Franklin County, Pennsylvania
- Church Hill, Tennessee
- Church Hill (Lexington, Virginia), a historic plantation house
- Church Hill, Richmond, Virginia, a district of Richmond, Virginia

== See also ==
- Churchill (disambiguation)
