= Churchill Bust =

Churchill Bust may refer to:

- Bust of Winston Churchill (Epstein), a sculpture by Jacob Epstein commissioned in 1945
- Bust of Winston Churchill, Mishkenot Sha'ananim, a 2002 sculpture by Oscar Nemon

== See also ==
- Statue of Winston Churchill, Parliament Square
- Statue of Winston Churchill, Palace of Westminster
- Winston Churchill (disambiguation)
