= Winston Churchill (disambiguation) =

Winston Churchill (1874–1965) was Prime Minister of the United Kingdom.

Winston Churchill may also refer to:

== Other people ==
- Winston Churchill (Cavalier), English soldier, historian, politician and ancestor of the prime minister
- Winston Churchill (novelist) (1871–1947), American novelist
- Winston Churchill (1940–2010), member of the UK parliament and grandson of the prime minister
- Winston Churchill Rea (1950s–2023), a Northern Irish loyalist activist

== Ships ==
- Sir Winston Churchill (schooner), a sail training ship launched in 1966
- MS Winston Churchill, a ferry launched in 1966 and scrapped in 2004
- SS Winston Churchill, a British cargo ship in service 1945–52
- USS Winston S. Churchill, a US Navy missile destroyer

== Other uses ==
- Cuvée Sir Winston Churchill, a type of champagne made by Pol Roger
- SR Battle of Britain class 21C151 Winston Churchill, a steam locomotive
- Winston Churchill Range, in the Canadian Rockies
- Winston Churchill Boulevard, in Canada
- Winston Churchill station, Mississauga, Canada
- Winston Churchill, a fictional cat in Pet Sematary
- Winston Churchill, a fictional cat in The Cat Who... series

== See also ==
- Churchill (disambiguation)
- Winston Churchill School (disambiguation)
- Sir Winston (horse)
