= Churchwell =

Churchwell is a surname. Notable people with the name include:

- Donnis Churchwell (1936–2010), American football offensive tackle
- Robert Churchwell (born 1972) American basketball player
- Sarah Churchwell (born 1970) is an American-born academic
- William Montgomery Churchwell, American politician and a member of the United States House of Representatives

== See also ==
- Churchill (disambiguation)
