= Churchill Park School =

School in Auckland, New Zealand

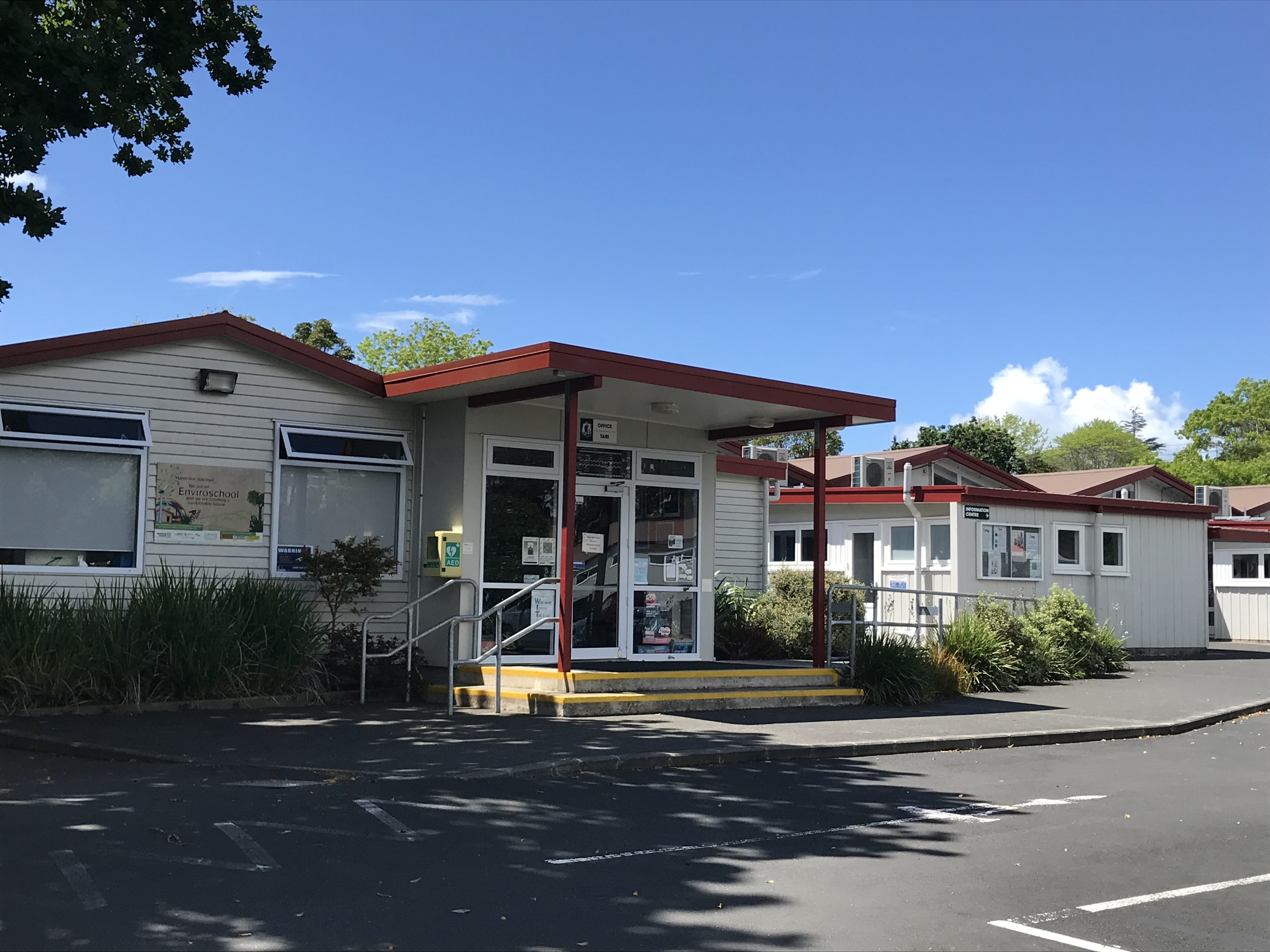

Location
- Kinsale Avenue, Auckland; 36.8513°S 174.8732°E

Information
- Type: Co-Ed Primary and intermediate (1-8)
- Motto: Stand Tall
- Established: 1964
- Ministry of Education Institution no.: 1246
- Principal: Marie Todd
- Enrolment: 391 (July 2026)
- Socio-economic decile: 10
- Website: www.churchillpark.school.nz

Churchill Park School is a co-ed primary and intermediate school in Glendowie, Auckland, New Zealand. It teaches from year one until year eight. It is surrounded by Churchill Park. It is a relatively small school, with a student population of approximately 450, with 20 classrooms.

The school had a library and an ICT facility that were destroyed by a fire on 15 November 2011. New library and computer facilities have been constructed and currently are in use.

== Academic performance ==
Churchill Park School students achieve at high levels, with a positive Education Review Office report in 2014.

== Extracurricular activities ==
Churchill Park School offers an array of extracurricular activities, including the opportunity to learn to play musical instruments drums, guitar or piano, perform with a choir or band, or participate in sports including netball, water polo, rugby and soccer. Churchill Park School excels in sport; teams from the school have been representatives at the citywide Auckland Championships. They also have an annual cross country where students compete in running races around the local park.

Churchill Park Students are split into four house groups for most sporting events. Students are randomly assigned to either rimu, kauri, kowhai or pohutukawa house. Each house has two student house captains (elected at the start of the year by their peers) and competes for the House Cup, awarded at the end of each term.

== Environmental projects ==
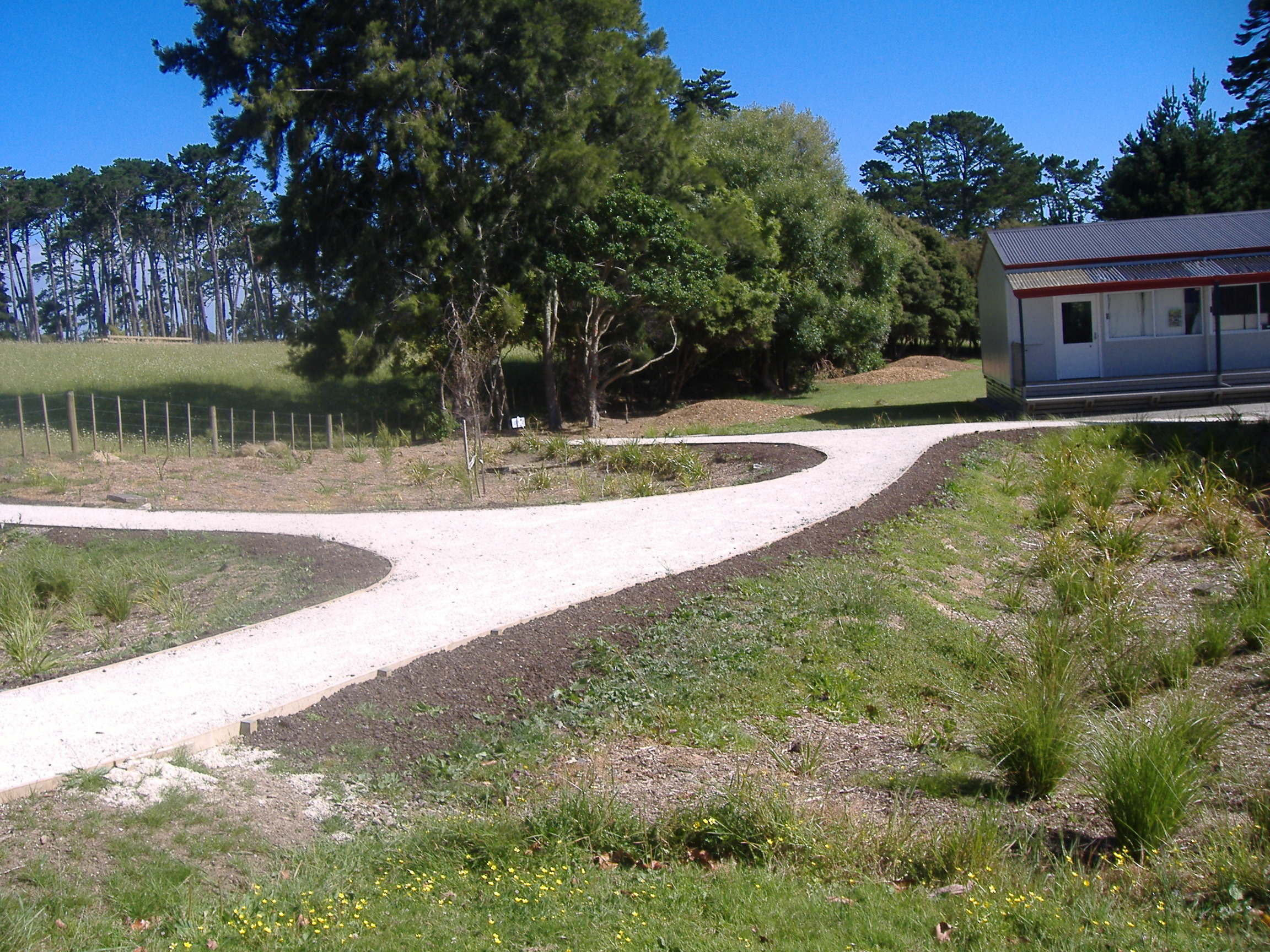
The Churchill Park Wetlands

Churchill Park School strives to be as environmentally friendly as possible and has received environmental awards, including the Enviroschools Gold Award. Efforts include having a worm farm, vegetable garden, and a student-planted wetland area. At the beginning of 2010, native trees were planted around the school. Environmental messages such as "I Only Drain Rain" are painted around their stormwater drains, to ensure that nothing other than water is poured down them, since they lead to the ocean.
