= Churchill Park =

Churchill Park may refer to:

- Churchillparken in Copenhagen, Denmark
- Churchill Park, Lautoka, a stadium in Lautoka, Fiji
- Churchill Park, Glendowie in Auckland, New Zealand
- Churchill National Park in Melbourne, Australia
- Churchill Park, St. John's, a suburb of St. John's, Newfoundland, Canada
- Sir Winston Churchill Provincial Park, Alberta, Canada
- Energlyn & Churchill Park railway station, a railway station in Caerphilly, Wales
