= Church Hill, Georgia =

Unincorporated community in Georgia, U.S.

Coordinates: 32°09′48″N 84°32′44″W

Church Hill is an unincorporated community in Marion County, in the U.S. state of Georgia.

== History ==
Church Hill was named for the churches near the original town site.
