= Churchill Downs (disambiguation) =

Churchill Downs is a horse racing complex in Louisville, Kentucky, famed for hosting the annual Kentucky Derby.

Churchill Downs may also refer to:

- "Churchill Downs" (song), a song by Jack Harlow from the 2022 album Come Home the Kids Miss You
- Churchill Downs Incorporated, the parent company of Churchill Downs racetrack
