= Churchill River =

Churchill River may refer to:

- Churchill River (Hudson Bay), which runs through Saskatchewan and Manitoba and drains into Hudson Bay
  - Little Churchill River, in Manitoba and a tributary of the Churchill River
- Churchill River (Atlantic), which drains the Smallwood Reservoir in Labrador into the Atlantic Ocean via Lake Melville
- Churchill River (electoral district), in Saskatchewan, Canada
