= Churchill Square =

Churchill Square can refer to:

- Churchill Square (Brighton and Hove), shopping centre in the city of Brighton and Hove, United Kingdom
- Churchill Square (St. John's), a shopping area in St. John's, Newfoundland, located on Elizabeth Avenue
- Churchill Square (Edmonton), an open area in front of Edmonton's City Hall used as a venue for various festivals and gatherings
