= Churchill School =

Churchill School may refer to:

- Churchill School (Baker City, Oregon), United States, a historic building
- Churchill School (Harare), Zimbabwe
- Churchill Public School, in Rainbow District School Board, Canada
- Churchill Public School (Cheyenne, Wyoming), United States
- Churchill Area High School, Churchill, Pennsylvania, U.S.
- Winston Churchill School (disambiguation), the name of several schools
