= Churchill Lake (disambiguation) =

Churchill Lake is a glacial lake in the north-west part of the Canadian province of Saskatchewan.

Churchill Lake may also refer to:

- Churchill Lake 193A, an Indian reserve of the Birch Narrows Dene Nation in Saskatchewan, Canada
- Churchill Lake (Maine) and Churchill Lake Dam, in Piscataquis County, Maine, US
- Churchill Lake, an alternative name for Lake Kerr in Marion County, Florida, US
