= Churchill County =

Churchill County may refer to:

- Churchill County, Queensland, Australia
- Churchill County, Nevada, United States
- USS Churchill County (LST-583), a United States Navy tank landing ship
