= Churchill Island (disambiguation) =

Churchill Island is an island in Western Port, Victoria, Australia.

Churchill Island or Churchill's Island may also refer to:

- Churchill Island Marine National Park, Victoria, Australia
- Churchill, Prince Edward Island, Canada
- Churchill's Island, a 1941 propaganda film
- An island in the Aroostook River near Crouseville, Maine
