= Churchill Museum =

The Churchill Museum may be one of the following entities associated with Winston Churchill:

- Chartwell, the principal adulthood home of Sir Winston Churchill, administered by the National Trust
- Churchill Archives Centre, in the grounds of Churchill College, Cambridge, England
- The Churchill War Rooms, a museum in London
- National Churchill Library and Center (NCLC), a public library and museum at the George Washington University in Washington, D.C.
- The National Churchill Museum (formerly the Winston Churchill Memorial and Library), located on the Westminster College campus in Fulton, Missouri
