= Churchill Falls (disambiguation) =

Churchill Falls is a waterfall on the Churchill River in Labrador, Canada.

Churchill Falls may also refer to:

- Churchill Falls, Newfoundland and Labrador, a community in Newfoundland and Labrador, Canada
- Churchill Falls (Labrador) Corporation Limited, a Canadian electric company
- Churchill Falls Airport, in Churchill Falls, Newfoundland and Labrador
