= Church Hill, Franklin County, Pennsylvania =

Unincorporated community in Pennsylvania, U.S.

Coordinates: 39°50′17″N 77°51′43″W

Church Hill is an unincorporated community in Franklin County, in the U.S. state of Pennsylvania.

== History ==
Church Hill was named for the Old White Church, which stood near the original town site.
