= Winston Churchill School =

Winston Churchill School, or variants, may refer to:

== Canada ==
- Winston Churchill High School (Lethbridge, Alberta)
- Sir Winston Churchill High School (Calgary, Alberta)
- Sir Winston Churchill Secondary School (Vancouver), British Columbia
- Churchill High School (Winnipeg, Manitoba)
- Winston Churchill Collegiate Institute, Scarborough, Toronto, Ontario
- Sir Winston Churchill Collegiate and Vocational Institute, Thunder Bay, Ontario
- Sir Winston Churchill Secondary School (Hamilton, Ontario)
- Sir Winston Churchill Secondary School (St. Catharines, Ontario)

== United Kingdom ==
- Winston Churchill School (England)

== United States ==
- Winston Churchill High School (Maryland) (Washington, DC area)
- Winston Churchill High School (Livonia, Michigan) (Detroit area)
- Winston Churchill High School (Eugene, Oregon)
- Winston Churchill High School (San Antonio, Texas)
- Winston Churchill Middle School, San Juan Unified School District, Sacramento County, California

== See also ==
- Winston Churchill (disambiguation)
  - Winston Churchill, Prime Minister of the United Kingdom 1940–1945 and 1951–1955
- Lycée International de Londres Winston Churchill
- Churchill College, Cambridge
- Churchill School (disambiguation)
