= The Churchill Arms =

Public house in London, England

Coordinates: 51.5069°N 0.1947°W

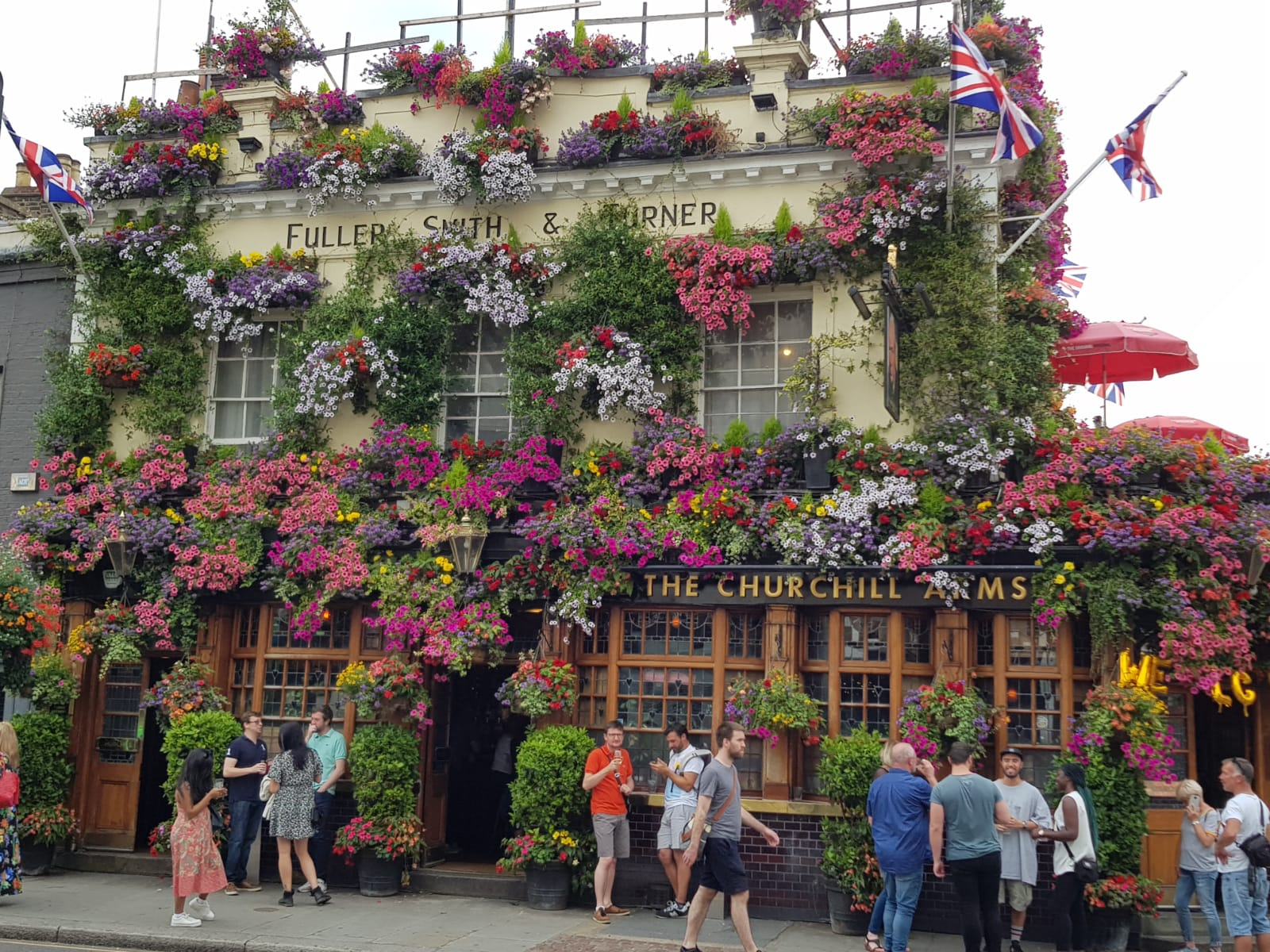
The Churchill Arms

The Churchill Arms is a public house at 119 Kensington Church Street on the corner with Campden Street, Notting Hill, London. There has been a pub on the site since 1824 when it opened under the name of the "Bedford Arms" but by 1826 it was renamed to "The Churchill Arms".

It is known for its exuberant floral displays, and extravagant Christmas displays in the winter, and has been described as London's most colourful pub.

== History ==
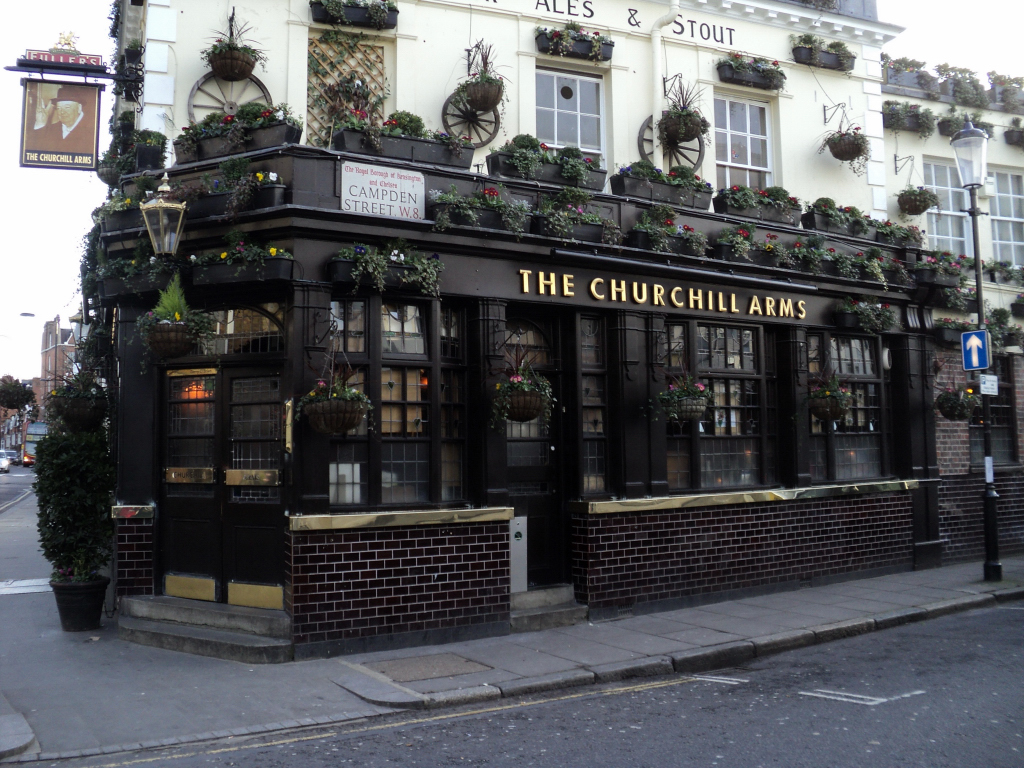
Campden Street side

In popular culture it was alleged it was called the "Church-on-the-Hill", and received its current name after the Second World War. This is refuted by references to it being called the Churchill Arms throughout the 19th Century and it was referenced as such in 1914 in the Official Gazette. In the 1930s it had its ground floor elevation added with good stained glass whilst the Victorian stuccoed upper story is original.

== Current features ==
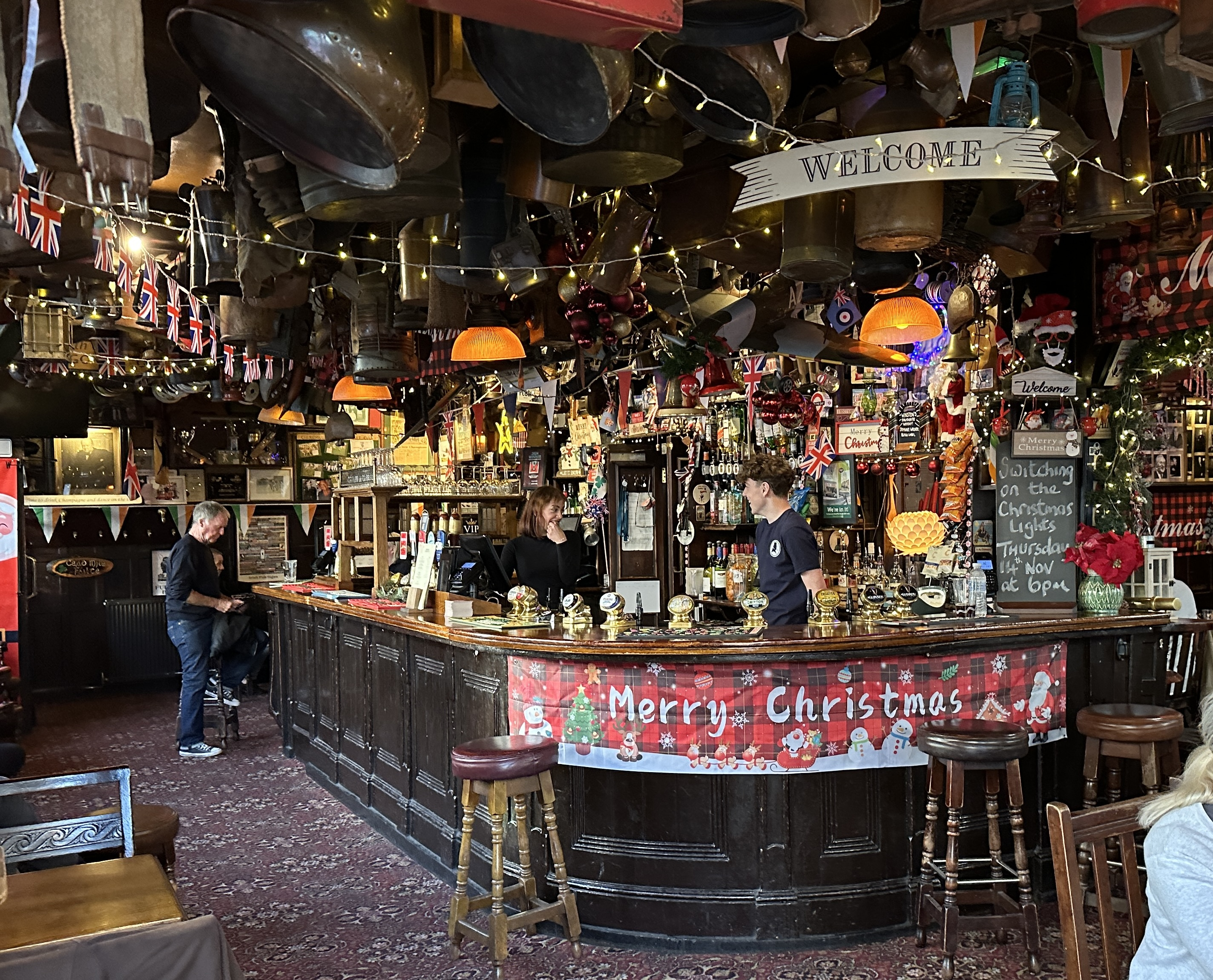
Interior view, 2024

The Churchill Arms is managed by Fuller's and has a Winston Churchill interior theme. The Churchill Arms claims to have been the first London pub with a Thai restaurant, having served such food since the early 1990s or earlier. The Thai restaurant is decorated with live flowers and plants.

The pub is decorated with all types of things associated with Winston Churchill, and falsely claims that Churchill made wartime broadcasts from the venue. Churchill's grandparents, the 7th Duke of Marlborough and Lady Frances Anne Emily Vane, were patrons of the pub in the 19th century.
