= Bust of Winston Churchill (Epstein) =

Sculpture by Jacob Epstein

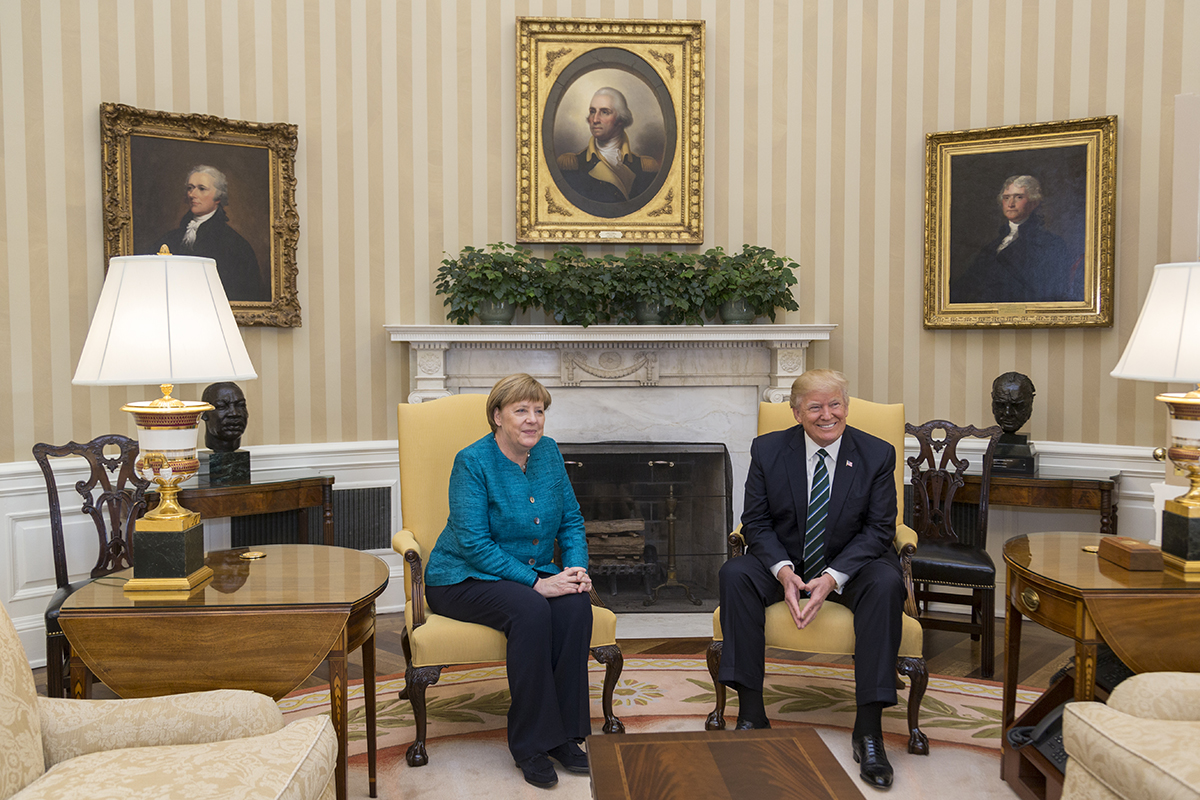
Bust in the Oval Office in 2017, to the right of the fireplace (seated, Angela Merkel and Donald Trump)

Jacob Epstein's bronze bust of Winston Churchill was completed in 1947 and cast in an edition often said to number 10 (but more, perhaps 12 or 16, are thought to exist). Epstein was commissioned by the War Artists Advisory Committee to create a sculpture of former British prime minister Winston Churchill in August 1945, after the end of the Second World War and shortly after Churchill lost the 1945 UK general election. Two casts have been previously displayed in the Oval Office. Another remains on display in the atrium of Churchill College, Cambridge.

== Background ==
Epstein applied to become a British official war artist after he was conscripted in the First World War, but his application was rejected. Epstein was also not appointed as an official war artist in the Second World War, but he was asked to undertake six commissions for the War Artists Advisory Committee. After completing bronze busts of a sailor, a soldier, and an airman – Admiral of the Fleet Sir Andrew Cunningham, General Sir Alan Cunningham, and Air Marshal Sir Charles Portal – and then a bust of Labour Party politician Ernest Bevin, Epstein accepted a commission to create busts of the independent politician John Anderson and former Conservative Party Prime Minister Winston Churchill. He received the last two commissions in August 1945, the month after Churchill lost the postwar 1945 UK general election.

The bust of Anderson was completed quickly, but Churchill's bust was delayed as the politician could not find time to sit for the artist until December 1946 and January 1947. By then, Churchill had left Downing Street, but his London residence at Hyde Park Gate was opposite Epstein's home. After three sittings at the artist's studio, Epstein visited Churchill at Chartwell for three further settings. While Epstein worked, Churchill smoked cigars and gave dictation to a procession of secretaries.

== Description ==
The completed bronze bust is approximately 12 inches (30 cm) high, excluding the base. In the words of the Imperial War Museum: "This is a powerful work. Churchill's ringed eyes display not only focus but also clarity of vision: the rough surface, his formidable grit and determination."

== Casts ==
The work was completed in 1947 and cast multiple times, in an edition often said to amount to 10 (but more, perhaps 12 or 16, are thought to exist). The casts are extremely rare and valuable with one being exhibited at the Leicester Galleries in March 1947. Casts are held by Churchill College, Cambridge, the Imperial War Museum, the Iziko South African National Gallery, and the Centre Georges Pompidou. Other casts are held in private collections, including the Hallmark Cards art collection. Several examples have been sold at auction in recent years, including at Christie's in November 2011 for £97,250 (from the Epstein-Evans Collection), at Sotheby's in June 2004 for £182,500, at Bonhams in November 2014 for £100,900, at Sotheby's in June 2015 for £106,500, and at Christie's in November 2015 for £110,500.

A cast was donated to the White House in 1965, under the presidency of Lyndon B. Johnson, by a group of American wartime friends of Churchill, including W. Averell Harriman, and also Frederick L. Anderson, David K. E. Bruce, Ira C. Eaker and Carl Spaatz. Some time after the end of the presidency of Johnson or in recent years, this cast has been displayed on the second floor of the White House, outside the Treaty Room, which is now part of the President's private rooms. In a 2015 press conference, President Barack Obama confirmed that the cast was moved partially to make way for a new bust of Martin Luther King Jr. in the Oval Office while reiterating his admiration to Churchill. It was temporarily moved back into the Oval Office in January 2017, after the inauguration of Donald Trump, until it was replaced by a cast from the British Government Art Collection (GAC).

The GAC has two casts. One was acquired at auction in 1983. It has been in Washington, D.C. since at least July 2001, when it was loaned to the White House for display in the Oval Office during the presidency of George W. Bush, while the White House's own cast, which never furnished the Oval Office, was being restored. The GAC cast was returned to the British Embassy in Washington DC in 2009, after the end of Bush's term of office, and was ultimately moved to the British Ambassador's residence. Despite the fact that the bust was only intended to remain for the duration of Bush's presidency, its removal caused controversy among British and American conservatives, who interpreted it as an affront to the Special Relationship. Future Prime Minister Boris Johnson wrote in The Sun that the decision represented "the part-Kenyan president’s ancestral dislike of the British Empire,” while Mike Huckabee claimed that "he probably grew up hearing that the British were a bunch of imperialists who persecuted his grandfather." It was also criticized by Charles Krauthammer in an opinion-editorial for The Washington Post. Daniel Pfeiffer responded to these criticisms by pointing out that there were two busts and that one of them remained in Obama's private residence.

The bust was ultimately returned to the Oval Office in January 2017 under the Trump presidency; before again being removed in 2021 as part of a re-design upon the election of Joe Biden which included busts of Rosa Parks and Cesar Chavez. The bust was once again returned to the Oval Office in January 2025 after Trump regained the presidency.

The GAC's second cast of the Epstein bust was acquired at auction in 1986, and is on display at the British Embassy in Paris. The GAC also has two other bronze busts, and a small bronze sculpture of Churchill with his wife Clementine, all cast by Oscar Nemon.

== See also ==
- Art in the White House
- List of sculptures by Jacob Epstein
