= MS Winston Churchill =

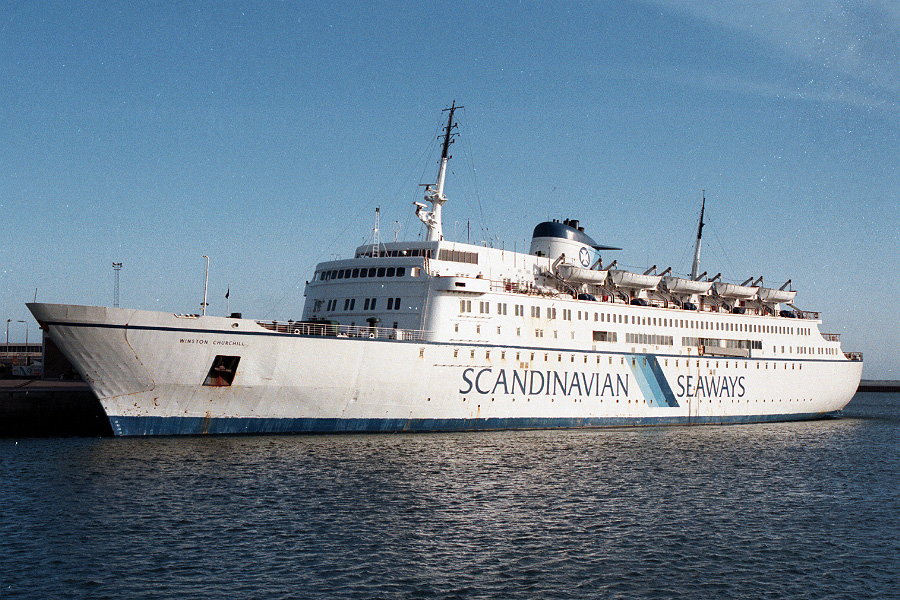
- Winston Churchill

History
- Name: 1967–1996: Winston Churchill; 1996–2004: Mayan Empress
- Operator: 1967–1996: DFDS Seaways; 1996–2004: Empress Cruise Lines
- Port of registry: 1967–1996: Esbjerg, Denmark; 1996–2004: Kingstown, Saint Vincent and the Grenadines
- Builder: Cantieri Navali del Tirreno e Riuniti, Riva Trigoso
- Yard number: 277
- Launched: 25 April 1967
- Identification: IMO number: 6718233
- Fate: Broken up in 2004

General characteristics
- Tonnage: 8,657 GT
- Length: 140.65 m (461 ft 5 in)
- Beam: 20.53 m (67 ft 4 in)
- Draught: 5.59 m (18 ft 4 in)
- Installed power: 2 x B&W 1050-VT2BF-110 diesels
- Speed: 21 knots
- Capacity: 750 Passengers; 180 Cars

MS Winston Churchill was built in 1967 by Cantieri Navali del Tirreno e Riuniti S.P.A. Riva Trigoso, Genoa, Italy.

The Winston Churchill was built as a car ferry for the Scandinavian Seaways DFDS service from Esbjerg to Harwich, and proved a very successful vessel on the route. As demand for vehicle-carrying services grew, larger vessels were required for the route and the Winston Churchill was transferred to the River Tyne in 1978, for the twice-weekly service to Gothenburg, following the arrival of the new DFDS vessel MS Dana Anglia on the Harwich route. The ferry ran aground on August 27, 1979 off the Swedish coast. All 587 passengers were safely taken off. She was eventually replaced on the Esbjerg route out of the Tyne by a new vessel, the MS King of Scandinavia.

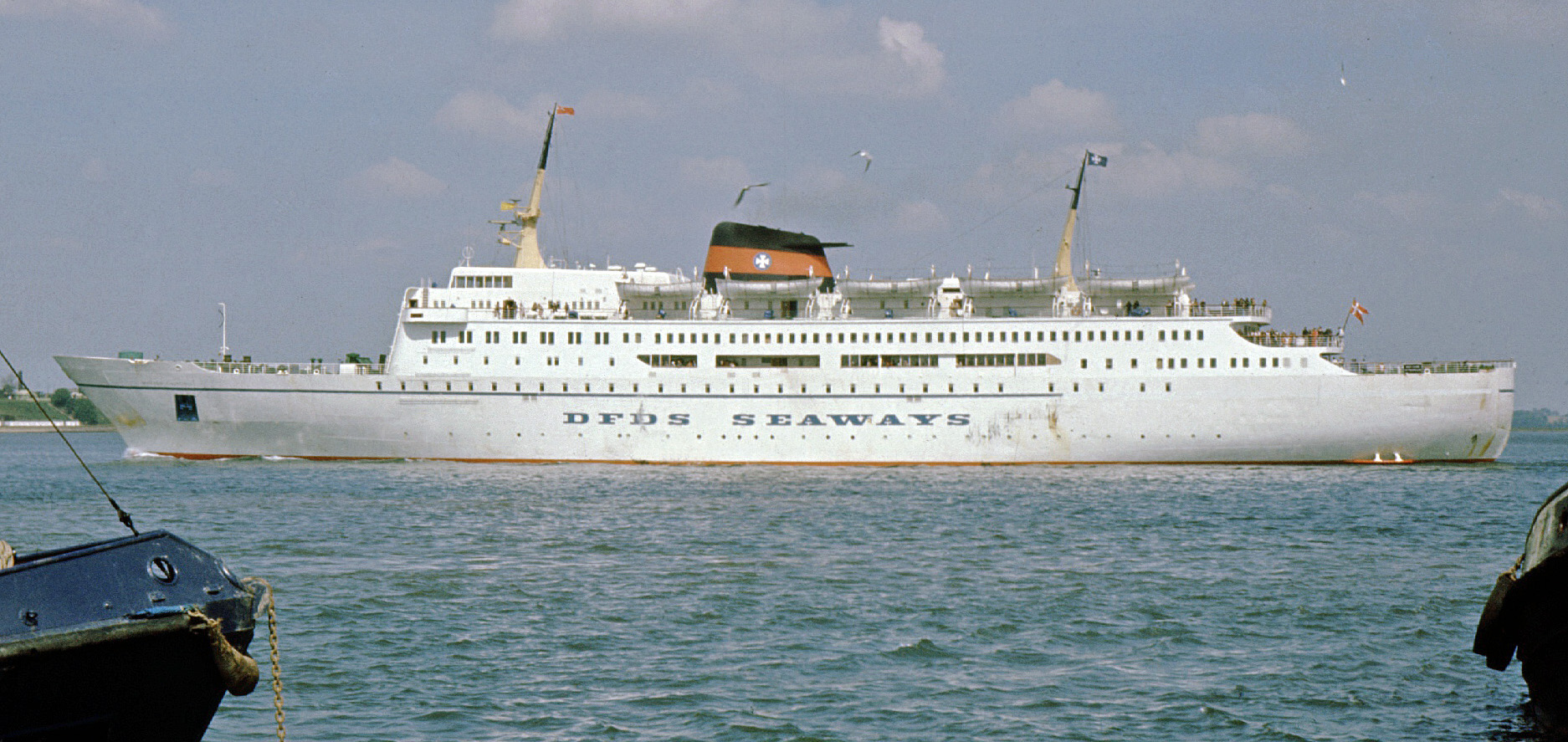
Winston Churchill 1974 in Harwich

During the following years she was used as a hotel ship for the Red Cross, housing refugees in the harbour of Copenhagen.

Later she was chartered to NATO, to perform as hotel ship for the British 'Royal Marine Commandos' Royal Marines during the large NATO exercise 'Cold Gose' in the north Atlantic during the winter 1986–87.

After the military exercises she went to be re-fitted for luxury cruises, at a yard on the German Kiel Canal, in early 1987. The picture with the white hull and the slant stripes in three shades of blue would be from the following years.

Then she would sail summer luxury cruises from Esbjerg, up along the Norwegian coast and into the fjords, following the old Hurtigruten trail to Northcap and back. Stops included, but were not limited to: Bergen, Andersness, Geiranger, Tromsø, Honningsvag.

Outside the summer season she would sail Esbjerg-Thorshavn and Esbjerg-Newcastle-Hamburg, on a weekly repeating schedule.

In 1995, she was moved to a new route, also from the Tyne, to IJmuiden, Netherlands, which she maintained until the following year. She was badly damaged by a fire in her alternator room during a refit at Esbjerg in April 1996, and she was subsequently repaired and sold to Empress Cruise Lines, becoming the Mayan Empress. She was eventually sold for scrap in India in 2004.

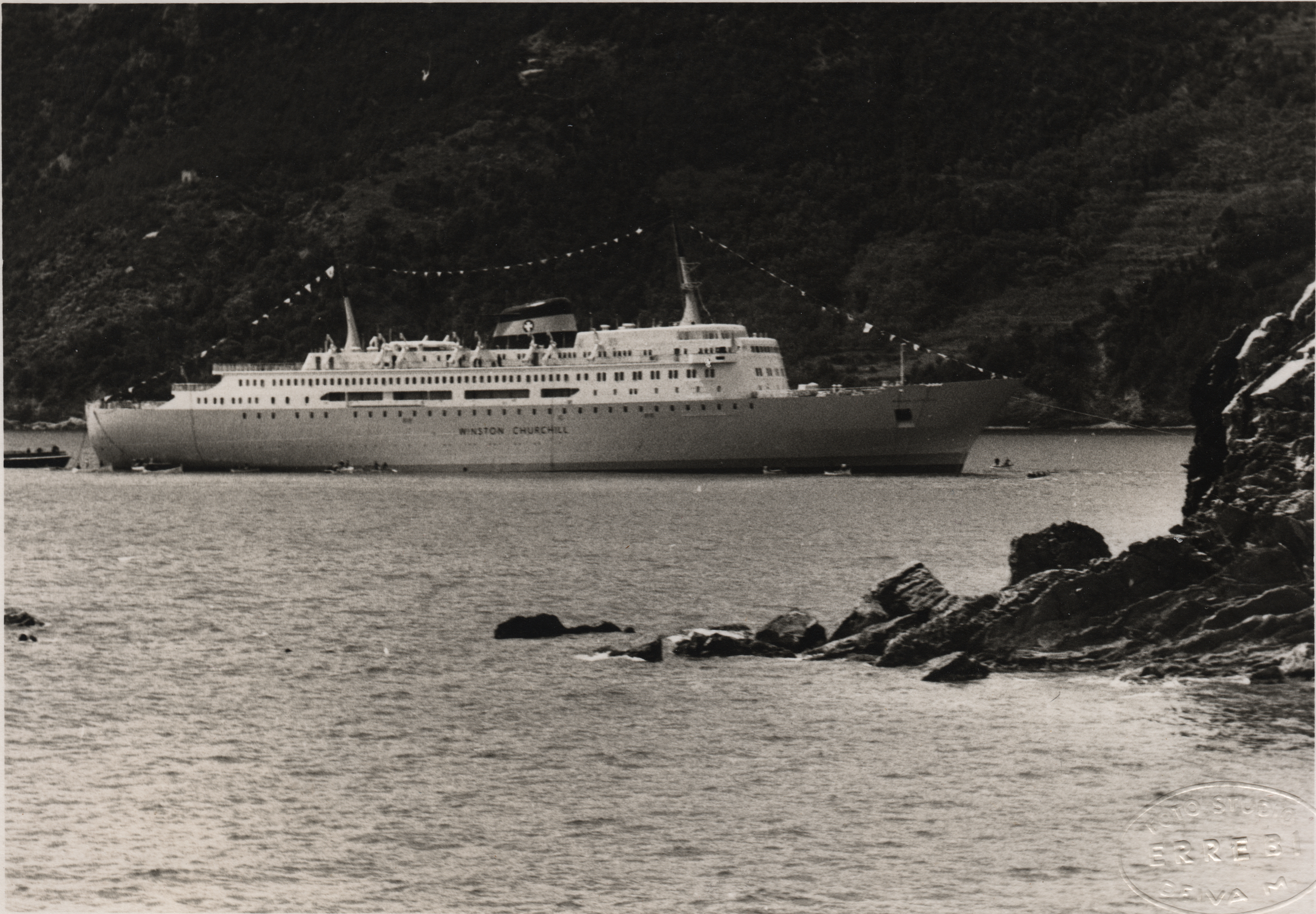
Launch of MS Winston Churchill
