= Churchill Park, New Zealand =

Park in Auckland, New Zealand

Churchill Park
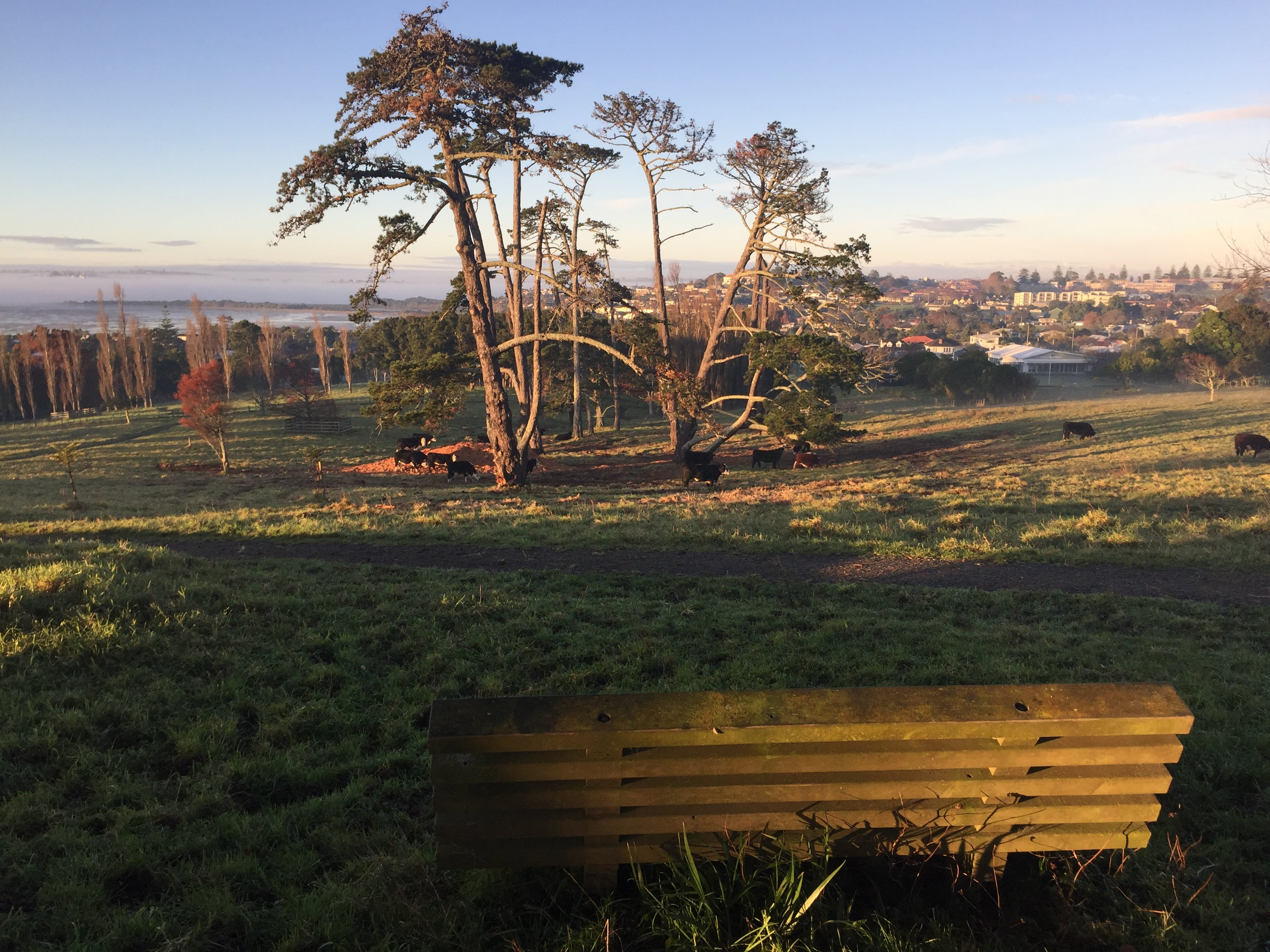
- Churchill Park Looking South
- Interactive map of Churchill Park
- Location: Glendowie, Auckland
- Coordinates: 36.8546°S 174.8754°E
- Area: 40 hectares (99 acres)
- Operator: Auckland Council
- Status: Open

Churchill Park is a 40-hectare park in the Auckland suburb of Glendowie, in New Zealand. It was named after Winston Churchill upon the park's creation in 1945, and lies on the eastern side of the Auckland isthmus towards the Tāmaki River. Glendowie suburb was established in the 1920s when George Riddell created a loop road in the area. The owner of the rural blocks of land in the centre of the loop combined them to form a golf course, which later became Churchill Park. The park is home to up to 60 grazing cattle as well as many native trees, birds and tuna kuwharuwharu (longfin eels).

Churchill Park School, located at the northern end of the park, undertook a wetlands planting project in conjunction with the Auckland City Council in 2009 to improve Churchill Park.
