= Preston by-election =

Preston by-election may refer to one of several by-election held for the British House of Commons constituency of Preston, in Lancashire:

- 1903 Preston by-election
- 1915 Preston by-election
- 1929 Preston by-election
- 1940 Preston by-election
- 1946 Preston by-election
- 2000 Preston by-election
