= Central Lancashire (disambiguation) =

Central Lancashire can refer to:-

- Central Lancashire - a former designated new town in England
- Central Lancashire - a rugby league team which was based in Preston, England, and is now known as Blackpool Panthers
- Lancashire Central (European Parliament constituency)
- The University of Central Lancashire - based in Preston, England
