= Moreing =

Moreing is a surname. Notable people with the surname include:

- Adrian Moreing (1892–1940), British politician
- Algernon Moreing (1889–1974), British politician, Member of Parliament
