= 1936 Preston by-election =

UK by-election

The 1936 Preston by-election was a parliamentary by-election held for the British House of Commons constituency of Preston on 25 November 1936. The seat had become vacant when the Conservative Member of Parliament William Kirkpatrick had resigned to take up the post of representative to China of the Export Credits Guarantee Department.

The Conservative candidate, Edward Cobb, held the seat for his party.

Preston by-election, 1936
Party	Candidate	Votes	%	±%
Conservative	Edward Cobb	32,575	48.8	−4.8
Labour	Frank Bowles	30,970	46.4	0.0
Independent	F. White	3,221	4.8	New
Majority		1,605	2.4	−1.0
Turnout		63,746	79.0	−2.9
Conservative hold		Swing		

== See also ==
- Preston (UK Parliament constituency)
- Preston, Lancashire
- 1903 Preston by-election
- 1915 Preston by-election
- 1929 Preston by-election
- 1940 Preston by-election
- 1946 Preston by-election
- 2000 Preston by-election
- List of United Kingdom by-elections
