= Michael Welsh (Conservative politician) =

British Conservative Party politician

Michael Welsh MBE
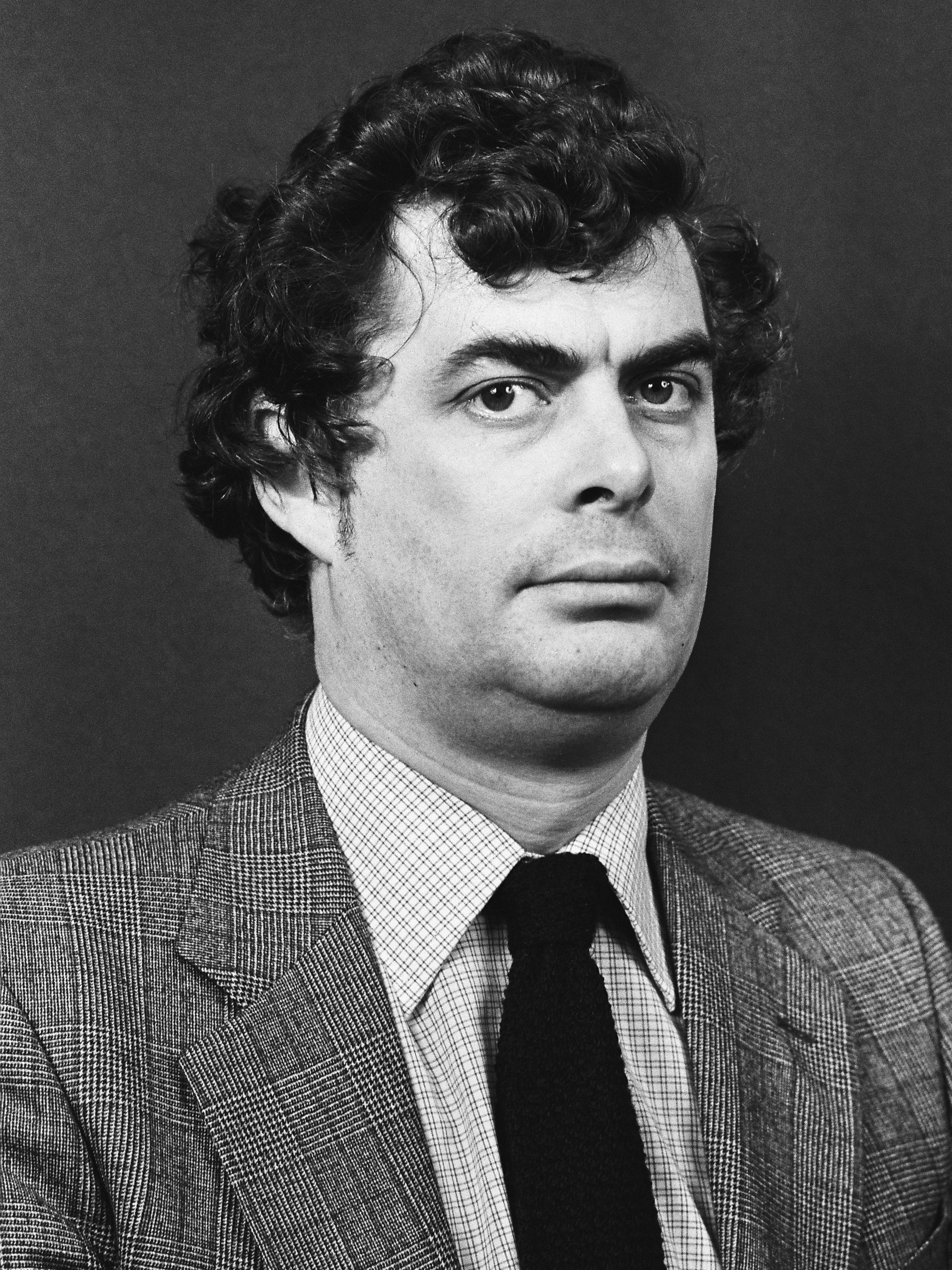

Member of the European Parliament
- In office 7 June 1979 – 9 June 1994
- Constituency: Lancashire Central

Personal details
- Party: Conservative Party (UK)
- Other political affiliations: European Democrats

Michael John Welsh MBE (born 22 May 1942) is a British Conservative Party politician. He served three terms as a Member of the European Parliament (MEP) from 1979 to 1994, after which he entered local government as a member of Lancashire County Council from 1997 to 2013. He led the Conservative group on the authority from 2003 to 2008.

== Early life and career ==
Welsh was educated at the independent school Dover College and at Lincoln College, Oxford. He joined the clothing company Levi Strauss & Co., and became their director of market development in 1976.

== European Parliament ==
At the 1979 European Parliament elections, Welsh fought and won the Lancashire Central seat for the Conservative Party. This constituency included Blackpool and Preston. He made a specialism in the textile industry which was a major employer in Lancashire. In 1981 he acted as rapporteur for the committee on External Economic Arrangements on the renewal of the Multi Fibre Agreement, and argued that the agreement should be extended for ten years, during which export levels should be fixed; he urged nations developing their textile industries not to force the EEC to put in protectionist measures.

Later in the 1980s Welsh wrote a series of pamphlets concerning labour market policy, the European Community's role in collective security, the effects of German reunification on Europe, and on accountability of European institutions to the United Kingdom Parliament. He was narrowly re-elected at the 1989 election, when the Labour Party performed well.

== Defeat ==
In the 1994 election, Welsh lost his seat to the Labour candidate Mark Hendrick. He was given another appointment by the Conservative government of the day as Chairman of Chorley and District NHS Trust, and set up the Action Centre for Europe Ltd, a pro-European Union thinktank for Conservatives. Welsh supported the United Kingdom adopting the Euro as its currency, and was an active participant in the Conservatives' intra-party debate on European policy in the 1990s.

== Lancashire County Council ==
Welsh was elected to Lancashire County Council in 1997 from Preston North East Ward. He became Leader of the Conservative group in 2003. He has supported retaining a two-tier approach to local government rather than allowing larger councils to become unitary authorities. In May 2008, he was ousted as the leader of the Conservative group by Geoff Driver.
