= William Kirkpatrick (Conservative politician) =

William MacColin Kirkpatrick (10 December 1878 – 3 December 1953) was an English Conservative Party politician. He was elected as member of parliament (MP) for Preston at the 1931 general election, and held the seat until his resignation in 1936 when he was appointed as the representative to China of the Export Credits Guarantee Department.

== Sources ==
- Craig, F. W. S. (1983) [First published 1969]. British parliamentary election results 1918-1949 (3rd ed.). Chichester: Parliamentary Research Services. ISBN 0-900178-06-X.
- Leigh Rayment's Historical List of MPs – Constituencies beginning with "P" (part 2)

Parliament of the United Kingdom
Preceded by William Jowitt and Tom Shaw	Member of Parliament for Preston; 1931–1936; With: Adrian Moreing	Succeeded by Adrian Moreing and Edward Cobb
