= John William Sunderland =

John William Sunderland (16 February 1896 – 24 November 1945) was an English Labour Party politician.

After serving in the First World War, Sunderland became secretary of the Todmorden Weavers Association, and a member of Lancashire County Council, serving as group leader.

He was elected, alongside his Labour colleague Samuel Segal, as member of parliament for Preston at the July 1945 general election, defeating Randolph Churchill and Edward Cobb, but four months later he died suddenly at Barrow, near Whalley, Lancashire, while visiting a children's school, aged 49.

== See also ==
- List of United Kingdom MPs with the shortest service

== Sources ==
- Craig, F. W. S. (1983) [1969]. British parliamentary election results 1918-1949 (3rd ed.). Chichester: Parliamentary Research Services. ISBN 0-900178-06-X.
- Leigh Rayment's Historical List of MPs – Constituencies beginning with "P" (part 2)

Parliament of the United Kingdom
Preceded by Edward Cobb and Randolph Churchill	Member of Parliament for Preston; Jul. 1945–Nov. 1945; With: Samuel Segal	Succeeded by Samuel Segal and Edward Shackleton
Trade union offices
Preceded by John Willie Hudson	General Secretary of the Great Harwood Power Loom Weavers' Association; 1930–1945	Succeeded by J. Booth
