= Leader of the Labour Party in the House of Lords =

Government role in the UK Parliament

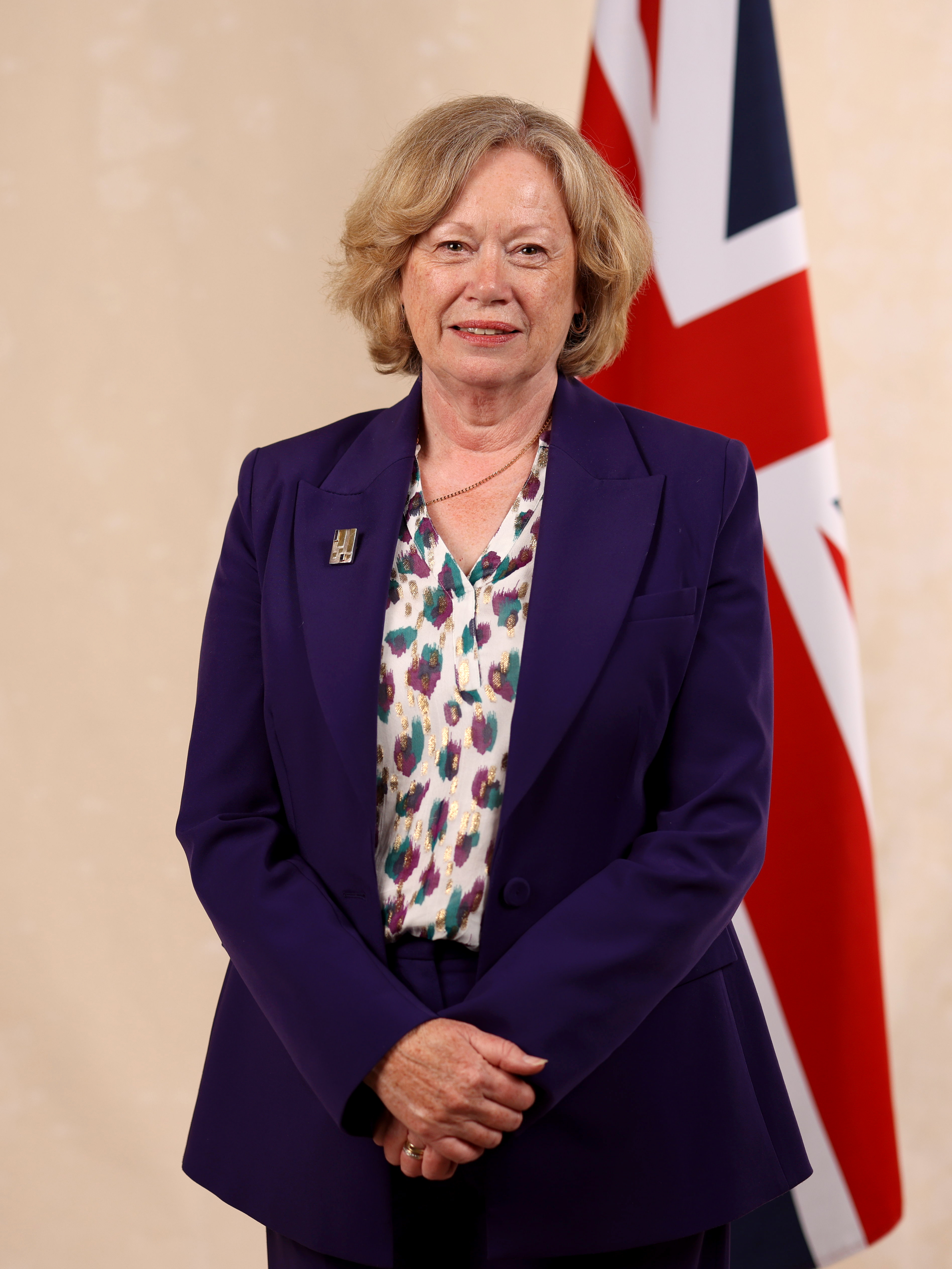
- Incumbent; The Baroness Smith of Basildon since 27 May 2015
- Inaugural holder: The Viscount Haldane
- Formation: 1924

The Leader of the Labour Party in the House of Lords is the parliamentary chairperson of the Labour Party of the House of Lords. The Labour Party peers elect the Leader of the Labour Party in the House of Lords.

When the Labour Party is the main party of opposition in the House of Commons, this post also acts as Shadow Leader of the House of Lords.

The current incumbent, Angela Smith, Baroness Smith of Basildon, was appointed in May 2015.

== List of Labour Leaders in the House of Lords ==
Leader	Portrait	Term of office		LOTO	Other ministerial offices held as Leader of the House of Lords
The Viscount Haldane (Richard Haldane)		1924	19 August 1928	1924–1928	– Lord High Chancellor of Great Britain (22 January 1924 – 6 November 1924)
The Lord Parmoor (Charles Cripps)		19 August 1928	24 August 1931	1928–1929; 1931	– Lord President of the Council (7 June 1929 – 24 August 1931)
The Lord Ponsonby of Shulbrede (Arthur Ponsonby)		7 October 1931	25 October 1935	1931–1935	
The Lord Snell (Harry Snell)		25 October 1935	22 May 1940	1935–1940	–
The Viscount Addison (Christopher Addison)		22 May 1940	11 December 1951	1940–1945; 1951–1952	– Dominions Secretary (3 August 1945 – 7 July 1947) – Commonwealth Relations Secretary (7 July 1947 – 7 October 1947) – Lord Keeper of the Privy Seal (7 October 1947 – 9 March 1951) – Paymaster General (2 July 1948 – 1 April 1949) – Lord President of the Council (9 March 1951 – 26 October 1951)
The Earl Jowitt (William Jowitt)		1952	14 December 1955	1952–1955	–
The Earl Alexander of Hillsborough (A. V. Alexander)		14 December 1955	16 October 1964	1955–1964	–
The Earl of Longford (Frank Pakenham)		18 October 1964	16 January 1968		– Lord Keeper of the Privy Seal (18 October 1964 – 23 December 1965) – Colonial Secretary (23 December 1965 – 6 April 1966) – Lord Keeper of the Privy Seal (6 April 1966 – 16 January 1968)
The Lord Shackleton (Edward Shackleton)		16 January 1968	4 March 1974	1970–1974	– Lord Keeper of the Privy Seal (16 January 1968 – 6 April 1968) – Paymaster General (6 April 1968 – 1 November 1968) – Lord Keeper of the Privy Seal (18 October 1968 – 19 June 1970)
The Lord Shepherd (Malcolm Shepherd)		4 March 1974	10 September 1976		– Lord Keeper of the Privy Seal (4 March 1974 – 10 September 1976)
The Lord Peart (Fred Peart)		10 September 1976	4 November 1982	1979–1982	– Lord Keeper of the Privy Seal (10 September 1976 – 4 May 1979)
The Lord Cledwyn of Penrhos (Cledwyn Hughes)		4 November 1982	18 July 1992	1982–1992	–
The Lord Richard (Ivor Richard)		18 July 1992	27 July 1998	1992–1997	– Lord Keeper of the Privy Seal (2 May 1997 – 27 July 1998)
The Baroness Jay of Paddington (Margaret Jay)		27 July 1998	8 June 2001		– Lord Keeper of the Privy Seal (27 July 1998 – 8 June 2001) – Minister for Women (27 July 1998 – 8 June 2001)
The Lord Williams of Mostyn (Gareth Williams)		8 June 2001	20 September 2003		– Lord Keeper of the Privy Seal (8 June 2001 – 13 June 2003) – Lord President of the Council (13 June 2003 – 20 September 2003)
The Baroness Amos (Valerie Amos)		6 October 2003	27 June 2007		– Lord President of the Council (6 October 2003 – 27 June 2007)
The Baroness Ashton of Upholland (Catherine Ashton)		27 June 2007	3 October 2008		– Lord President of the Council (28 June 2007 – 3 October 2008)
The Baroness Royall of Blaisdon (Janet Royall)		3 October 2008	27 May 2015	2010–2015	– Lord President of the Council (3 October 2008 – 5 June 2009) – Chancellor of the Duchy of Lancaster (5 June 2009 – 11 May 2010)
The Baroness Smith of Basildon (Angela Smith)		27 May 2015	Incumbent	2015–2024	– Lord Keeper of the Privy Seal (5 July 2024 – present)

== See also ==
- Leader of the Labour Party (UK)
