= Lancashire Central (European Parliament constituency) =

Former European Parliament constituency

- European Parliament constituency
- Boundary within North West England (1979-1984)
- Member state: United Kingdom
- Created: 1979
- Dissolved: 1999
- MEPs: 1

Boundary within North West England (1984–1994)

Prior to its uniform adoption of proportional representation in 1999, the United Kingdom used first-past-the-post for the European elections in England, Scotland and Wales. The European Parliament constituencies used under that system were smaller than the later regional constituencies and only had one Member of the European Parliament each.

Created for the 1979 European Parliament elections in 1979, Lancashire Central was a single-member constituency formed from the grouping of numerous neighbouring UK Parliament constituencies.

Boundary within North West England (1994–1999)

== Boundaries ==
- 1979–1984: Blackpool North, Blackpool South, Chorley, Fylde South, Preston North, Preston South, Westhoughton, Wigan
- 1984–1994: Blackpool North, Blackpool South, Chorley, Fylde, Preston, Ribble Valley, South Ribble, West Lancashire
- 1994–1999: Blackpool North, Blackpool South, Burnley, Fylde, Pendle, Preston, Ribble Valley, Wyre

== Members of the European Parliament ==
Elected	Member	Party
1979	Michael Welsh	Conservative
1994	Mark Hendrick	Labour

== Election results ==
European Parliament election, 1979: Lancashire Central
Party	Candidate	Votes	%	±%
Conservative	Michael Welsh	91,355	51.1	
Labour	I J Taylor	63,709	37.7	
Liberal	A D (David) Sanders	13,821	8.2	
Majority		27,646	16.4	
Turnout		168,885	31.6	
Conservative win (new seat)				

European Parliament election, 1984: Lancashire Central
Party	Candidate	Votes	%	±%
Conservative	Michael Welsh	82,370	50.4	−0.7
Labour	Helen Jones	56,175	34.4	−3.3
SDP	Michael Gallagher	24,936	15.2	+7.0
Majority		26,195	16.0	−0.4
Turnout		163,481	31.2	−0.4
Conservative hold		Swing		

European Parliament election, 1989: Lancashire Central
Party	Candidate	Votes	%	±%
Conservative	Michael Welsh	81,125	42.1	−8.3
Labour	Geoffrey Smith	75,437	39.2	+4.8
Green	Haldora Ingham	28,777	14.9	New
SLD	Janet Ross-Mills	7,378	3.8	−9.4
Majority		5,688	2.9	−13.1
Turnout		192,717	35.8	+4.6
Conservative hold		Swing		

European Parliament election, 1994: Lancashire Central
Party	Candidate	Votes	%	±%
Labour	Mark Hendrick	73,420	43.9	+4.7
Conservative	Michael Welsh	61,229	36.6	−5.5
Liberal Democrats	Janet Ross-Mills	20,578	12.3	+8.5
Independent British Home Rule	David Hill	6,751	4.0	New
Green	Christopher Maile	4,169	2.5	−12.4
Natural Law	Janet Aycliffe	1,127	0.7	New
Majority		12,191	7.3	N/A
Turnout		93,854	33.2	−2.6
Labour gain from Conservative		Swing		
