= 1946 Preston by-election =

UK parliamentary by-election

The 1946 Preston by-election was a parliamentary by-election held on 31 January 1946 for the British House of Commons constituency of Preston in Lancashire. The seat had become vacant when the Labour Member of Parliament John Sunderland had died on 24 November 1945. Sunderland had held the seat since the 1945 general election.

The Labour candidate, Edward Shackleton, held the seat for his party.

== Result ==
1946 Preston by-election
Party	Candidate	Votes	%	±%
Labour	Edward Shackleton	32,189	55.6	+7.3
Conservative	Harmar Nicholls	25,718	44.4	+2.6
Majority		6,471	11.2	+8.4
Turnout		57,907		
Labour hold		Swing		

== See also ==
- Preston (UK Parliament constituency)
- Preston
- 1903 Preston by-election
- 1915 Preston by-election
- 1929 Preston by-election
- 1936 Preston by-election
- 1940 Preston by-election
- 2000 Preston by-election
- List of United Kingdom by-elections
