= Samuel Segal, Baron Segal =

British politician

The Right Honourable The Lord Segal MRCS LRCP

Member of Parliament for Preston
- In office 26 July 1945 – 3 February 1950
- Preceded by: Randolph Churchill & Edward Cobb
- Succeeded by: Constituency Abolished

Personal details
- Born: 2 April 1902
- Died: 4 June 1985 (aged 83)
- Party: Labour

Samuel Segal, Baron Segal, MRCS, LRCP, (2 April 1902 – 4 June 1985) was a British doctor and Labour Party politician who became Deputy Speaker of the House of Lords.

== Early life ==
Samuel Segal was the son of Moshe Zvi Segal and the elder brother of Judah Segal. He was born at Oxford in April 1902 to a Jewish household, and moved to Newcastle upon Tyne in 1909 with his family. He was educated at the Royal Grammar School, Newcastle upon Tyne, Jesus College, Oxford (Exhibitioner; Honorary Fellow, 1966), and Westminster Hospital (Scholar).

== Medical career ==
He was a casualty Surgeon at Westminster Hospital then a Senior Clinical Assistant at Great Ormond Street Hospital. He served on several London County Council Hospital Committees.

Following the start of World War II, he joined RAFVR Medical Branch, October 1939. He served in Aden 1940, Western Desert 1941, Syrian Campaign 1941. He was attached to the Greek Air Force, 1941; Squadron Leader, 1942; Senior Medical Officer RAF Naval Co-operation Group in Mediterranean, 1942. He was on the Headquarters Staff Middle East, 1943–44 and the Air Ministry Medical Staff, 1944–45.

He was a regional medical officer for the Ministry of Health, 1951–62.

== Political career ==
After unsuccessfully fighting the Tynemouth seat at the 1935 general election, he was stood again unsuccessfully at the Birmingham Aston by-election in May 1939. However, at the 1945 general election he was elected for Preston.

He advised Aneurin Bevan on the attitudes of medical practitioners to the creation of the National Health Service in 1948. He spoke against Government policy in Palestine and in favour of the creation of Israel.

The Preston constituency was abolished for the 1950 general election, when Segal stood for the new Preston North seat, but lost by 938 votes to the Conservative candidate, Julian Amery.

On 18 December 1964, he was created a life peer as Baron Segal, of Wytham in the Royal County of Berks. In the House of Lords he was Deputy Speaker and Deputy Chairman of Committees from 1973 to 1982.

== Other posts ==
Lord Segal was chairman of the British Association for the Retarded, the National Society for Mentally Handicapped Children (now Mencap), the Anglo-Israel Association and the Anglo-Israel Archaeological Association. He was a governor of Carmel College, and life governor of Manchester College.

== Notes ==
Parliament of the United Kingdom
Preceded by Randolph Churchill and Edward Cobb	Member of Parliament for Preston; 1945–1950; With: John Sunderland, to 1946; Edward Shackleton, 1946–1950	constituency abolished
