= Randolph Churchill =

British journalist, writer and politician (1911–1968)

The Honourable Randolph Churchill MBE
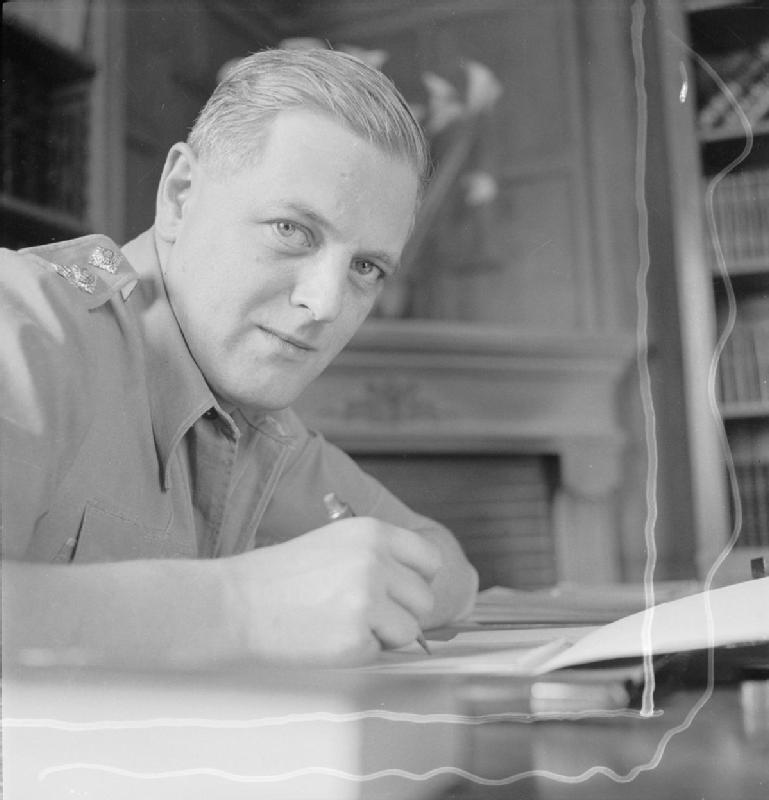
- Randolph Churchill, c. 1941

Member of Parliament for Preston
- In office 29 September 1940 – 5 July 1945 Serving with Edward Cobb
- Preceded by: Adrian Moreing
- Succeeded by: John William Sunderland

Personal details
- Born: Randolph Frederick Edward Spencer Churchill; 28 May 1911 London, England
- Died: 6 June 1968 (aged 57) East Bergholt, Suffolk, England
- Resting place: St Martin's Church, Bladon
- Party: Conservative
- Spouses: Pamela Digby (m. 1939; div. 1946); June Osborne (m. 1948; div. 1961)
- Children: Winston Churchill; Arabella Churchill
- Parents: Winston Churchill; Clementine Hozier
- Education: Eton College, Christ Church, Oxford
- Profession: Journalist; soldier

Military service
- Allegiance: United Kingdom
- Branch/service: British Army
- Years of service: 1938–1961
- Rank: Major
- Unit: 4th Queen's Own Hussars; Queen's Royal Irish Hussars
- Battles/wars: Second World War; Western Desert campaign; World War II in Yugoslavia
- Awards: Member of the Order of the British Empire

Major Randolph Frederick Edward Spencer Churchill (Note: This English person has the barrelled surname Spencer Churchill, but is known by the surname Churchill.) (28 May 1911 – 6 June 1968) was a British journalist, writer and politician.

The only son of British Prime Minister Winston Churchill and his wife, Clementine, Randolph was brought up to regard himself as his father's political heir, although their relations became strained in later years. In the 1930s, he stood unsuccessfully for Parliament a number of times, causing his father embarrassment. He was elected unopposed as Conservative Member of Parliament (MP) for Preston at the 1940 Preston by-election. During the Second World War, he served with the SAS in North Africa and with Tito's partisans in Yugoslavia. Randolph lost his seat in 1945 and was never re-elected to Parliament. Despite his lack of success in politics, Randolph enjoyed a successful career as a writer and journalist. In the 1960s, he wrote the first two volumes of the official life of his father.

Randolph was married and divorced twice. His first wife was Pamela Digby (later Harriman); their son Winston later became a Conservative MP. Throughout his life, Randolph had a reputation for rude, drunken behaviour. By the 1960s, his health had collapsed from years of heavy drinking; he outlived his father by only three years.

== Childhood ==
Randolph Churchill was born at his parents' house at Eccleston Square, London, on 28 May 1911. (Note: The ODNB states that he was born in Bolton Street, Mayfair, which appears to be an error. In Vol II of his biography of his father (Young Statesman, p. 290), Randolph states that his parents had moved from Bolton Street to Eccleston Square in March 1909.) His parents nicknamed him "the Chumbolly" before he was born. (Note: The meaning of the word is obscure. Randolph himself claimed not to know what it meant [Young Statesman pp. 350–55] His sister Mary Soames believed that it meant "a beautiful flower" in North West India, or else was a Farsi (Persian) word for a fat, happy child. Mary Lovell writes that it was an Indian word for a chubby, happy child.)

His father Winston Churchill was already a leading Liberal Cabinet Minister, and Randolph was christened in the House of Commons crypt on 26 October 1911, with Foreign Secretary Sir Edward Grey and Conservative politician F. E. Smith among his godparents. Randolph and his older sister Diana had for a time to be escorted by plain clothes detectives on their walks in the park, because of threats by suffragettes to kidnap them. He was a page at the marriage of the Prime Minister's daughter Violet Asquith to Maurice Bonham Carter on 1 December 1915.

He recalled the Zeppelin raids of 1917 as "a great treat", as the children were taken from their beds in the middle of the night, wrapped in blankets, and "allowed" to join the grown-ups in the cellar; he also recalled the Armistice celebrations at Blenheim Palace.

He went to Sandroyd School in Surrey, and later admitted that he had had a problem with authority and discipline. His headmaster reported to his father that he was "very combative". Winston, who had been neglected by his parents as a small boy, visited his son at prep school as often as possible. Randolph was very good-looking as a child and into his twenties. In his autobiography Twenty-One Years (pp. 24–25) he recorded that at the age of ten he had been "interfered with" by a junior prep school master, who made Randolph touch him sexually; Randolph had only realised that something was amiss when a matron came in, causing the master to leap embarrassed to his feet. At home, a maid overheard Randolph confiding in his sister Diana. He later wrote that he had never seen his father so angry, and that he had made a one-hundred-mile (160 km) trip to demand that the teacher be dismissed, only to learn that the teacher had already been sacked.

He remembered that he and Diana returned from ice-skating in Holland Park on 22 June 1922 to find the house guarded and being searched by "tough-looking men" following the assassination of Field Marshal Henry Wilson.

== Eton ==
Winston gave his son a choice of Eton College or Harrow School, and he chose Eton. Randolph later wrote "I was lazy and unsuccessful both at work and at games ... and was an unpopular boy". He was once said to have been given "six up" (i.e. a beating) by his house's Captain of Games (a senior boy) for being "bloody awful all round". Michael Foot later wrote that this was "the kind of comprehensive verdict which others who had dealings with him were always searching for." He once wrote apologising to his father for "having done so badly and disappointed you so much". During the general strike of 1926 he fixed up a secret radio set as his housemaster would not allow him to have one. In November 1926 his headmaster wrote to his father to inform him that he had caned Randolph, then aged 15, after all five of the masters then teaching him had independently reported him for "either being idle or being a bore with his chatter".

As a teenager Randolph fell in love with Diana Mitford, sister of his friend Tom Mitford. Tom Mitford was regarded as having a calming influence on him, although his housemaster Colonel Sheepshanks wrongly suspected Randolph and Tom of being lovers; Randolph replied, "I happen to be in love with his sister".

Randolph was "a loquacious and precocious boy". From his teenage years he was encouraged to attend his father's dinner parties with leading politicians of the day, drink and have his say, and he later recorded that he would simply have laughed at anyone who had suggested that he would not go straight into politics and perhaps even become prime minister by his mid-twenties like William Pitt the Younger. His sister later wrote that he "manifestly needed a father's hand" but his father "spoiled and indulged him", and did not take seriously the complaints of his schoolmasters. He was influenced by his godfather Lord Birkenhead (F. E. Smith), an opinionated and heavy-drinking man. Winston Churchill was Chancellor of the Exchequer from late 1924 until 1929. Busy in that office, he neglected his daughters in favour of Randolph, who was his only son. On a visit to Italy in 1927 Winston and Randolph were received by Pope Pius XI. In later life "relations between Winston and Randolph were always uneasy, the father alternately spoiling and being infuriated by the son."

In April 1928 Winston forwarded a satisfactory school report to Clementine, who was in Florence, commenting that Randolph was "developing fast" and would be fit for politics, the bar or journalism and was "far more advanced than I was at his age". His mother replied that "He is certainly going to be an interest, an anxiety & an excitement in our lives". He had cool relations with his mother from an early age, in part because she felt him to be spoiled and arrogant as a result of his father's overindulgence. Clementine's biographer writes that "Randolph was for decades a recurrent embarrassment to both his parents".

In what would turn out to be his final report on leaving Eton, Robert Birley, one of his history teachers, wrote of his native intelligence and writing ability, but added that he found it too easy to get by on little work or with a journalist's knack of spinning a single idea into an essay.

== Oxford ==
Randolph went up to Christ Church, Oxford, in January 1929, partway through the academic year and not yet eighteen, after his father's friend Professor Lindemann had advised that a place had fallen vacant.

In May he spoke for his father at the May 1929 general election. Between August and October 1929 Randolph and his uncle accompanied his father (now out of office) on his lecture tour of the US and Canada. His diary of the trip was later included in Twenty-One Years. On one occasion he impressed his father by delivering an impromptu five-minute reply to a tedious speech by a local cleric. At San Simeon (the mansion of press baron Randolph Hearst) he lost his virginity to the Austrian-born actress Tilly Losch, who was also at one time the lover of his close friend Tom Mitford.

Randolph was already drinking double brandies at the age of nineteen, to his parents' consternation. He did little work or sport at Oxford and spent most of his time at lengthy lunch and dinner parties with other well-connected undergraduates and with dons who enjoyed being entertained by them. Randolph later claimed that he had benefited from the experience, but at the time his lifestyle earned him a magisterial letter of rebuke from his father (29 December 1929), warning him that he was "not acquiring any habits of industry or concentration" and that he would withdraw him from Oxford if he did not apply himself to his studies. Winston Churchill had also received a similar and oft-quoted letter of rebuke from his own father, Lord Randolph Churchill, at almost exactly the same age.

== Speaking tour of the United States ==
Randolph dropped out of Oxford in October 1930 to conduct a lecture tour of the US. He was already in debt; his mother guessed correctly that he would never finish his degree. Contrary to his later claims, his father attempted to dissuade him at the time.

Unlike his father, who had become a powerful orator through much practice, and whose speeches always required extensive preparation, public speaking came easily to Randolph. Randolph's son later recorded that this was a mixed blessing: "because of the very facility with which he could speak extemporaneously[,] [he] failed to make the effort required to bring him more success".

Randolph very nearly married Kay Halle of Cleveland, Ohio, seven years his senior. His father wrote begging him not to be so foolish as to marry before he had established a career. Clementine visited him in December, using money Winston had given her to buy a small car. Contrary to newspaper reports that she had crossed the Atlantic to put a stop to the wedding, she only learned of the engagement when she arrived. She found Randolph, to her horror, living in an extravagant suite of hotel rooms, but was able to write to Miss Halle's father, who agreed that it would be unwise for their children to marry.

Clementine wrote to her husband of one of Randolph's lectures "Frankly, it was not at all good" and commented that he should have had it well-practised by now, although she was impressed by his delivery. She went home in April 1931, having enjoyed Randolph's company in New York. She would later look back on the trip with nostalgia.

Randolph's lecture tour earned him $12,000 (£2,500 at the then rate of exchange, roughly £150,000 at 2020 prices). By the time of his mother's arrival he had already spent £1,000 in three months, despite being on a £400 annual parental allowance. He left the US owing $2,000 to his father's friend, the financier Bernard Baruch, a debt which he did not repay for thirty years.

== Early 1930s ==
In October 1931 Randolph began a lecture tour of the UK. He lost £600 by betting wrongly on the results of the general election; his father paid his debts on condition he gave up his chauffeur-driven Bentley, a more extravagant car than his father drove. In 1931 he shared Edward James's house in London with John Betjeman. By the early 1930s Randolph was working as a journalist for the Rothermere press. He wrote in an article in 1932 that he planned to "make an immense fortune and become Prime Minister". He warned that the Nazis meant war as early as March 1932 in his Daily Graphic column; his son Winston later claimed that he was the first British journalist to warn about Hitler.

In 1932 Winston Churchill had Philip Laszlo paint an idealised portrait of his son for his 21st birthday. (Note: It appears as the cover picture of His Father's Son, Winston Churchill's 1997 life of his father Randolph.) Winston Churchill organised a "Fathers and Sons" dinner at Claridge's for his birthday on 16 June 1932, with Lord Hailsham and his son Quintin Hogg, Lord Cranborne and Freddie Birkenhead, the son of Winston's late friend F. E. Smith. Also present were Admiral of the Fleet Earl Beatty and his son, and Oswald Mosley (then still seen as a coming man). That year Randolph flew into a rage with Lord Beaverbrook, when his Daily Express singled him out in a story on the sons of great men, which sneered that "major fathers as a rule breed minor sons, so our little London peacocks had better tone down their fine feathers." "The function of the gossip writer", said Randolph, "is not among those which commend themselves mostly highly to my generation" (in middle age Randolph would himself become a highly paid London gossip columnist).

Randolph reported from the German elections in July 1932. He encouraged his father to try to meet Adolf Hitler in summer 1932 whilst he was retracing the Duke of Marlborough's march to Blenheim (Winston was writing the Duke's life at the time); the meeting fell through at the last minute as Hitler excused himself. Randolph had an affair with Doris Castlerosse in 1932, causing a near fight with her husband. She later claimed to have had an affair with his father Winston in the mid-1930s, although Winston's biographer Andrew Roberts believes the latter claim unlikely to be true.

Randolph, then aged just 21, was sent to Paraguay in August 1932 by Beaverbrook's Daily Express. Just after his arrival in Asunción, he conducted an interview with Major Arturo Bray Riquelme, Director of the Military School and Commander of the R.I. 6 "Boquerón", formed from the officers and cadets of the Paraguayan Military School; this report was published in the Daily Express on Thursday, 11 August 1932, when the R.I. 6 was in full preparation to depart or at the war front in the Chaco. Arturo Bray was highly sought after by the British press as he had served as a British officer in the World War I and was highly decorated.

At Lady Diana Cooper's fortieth birthday party in Venice that year a woman was deliberately burned on her hand with a cigarette by a thwarted lover, and Randolph sprang to her defence.

Randolph also became embroiled in the controversy of the February 1933 King and Country debate at the Oxford Union Society. Three weeks after the Union had passed a pacifist motion, Randolph and his friend Lord Stanley proposed a resolution to delete the previous motion from the Union's records. After a poor speech from Stanley, the president, Frank Hardie, temporarily handed over the chair to the librarian and opposed the motion on behalf of the Union, a very unusual move. The minutes record that he received "a very remarkable ovation". Randolph was then met by a barrage of hisses and stink bombs. His speech, facing what the minutes describe as a "very antipathetic and even angry house" was "unfortunate in his manner and phrasing" and was met with "delighted jeers". He then attempted to withdraw the motion. Hardie was willing to permit this, but an ex-president pointed out from the floor that a vote of the whole house was required to allow a motion to be withdrawn. The request to withdraw was defeated by acclamation and the motion was then defeated by 750 votes to 138 (a far better attendance than the original debate had attained). Randolph had persuaded a number of other former students, life members of the Union, to attend in the hope of carrying his motion. A bodyguard of Oxford Conservatives and police escorted Churchill back to his hotel after the debate. Sir Edward Heath recorded in his memoirs that after the debate some of the undergraduates had been intent on debagging him. (Note: Heath wrote about Randolph with contempt, but went up to Oxford in October 1935 so was not an eyewitness.) Winston Churchill wrote praising his son's courage in addressing a large, hostile audience, adding that "he was by no means cowed".

Randolph's good looks and self-confidence soon brought him some success as a womaniser, but his attempt to seduce one young woman at Blenheim failed after she spent the night in bed with his cousin Anita Leslie for protection, while Randolph sat on the side of the bed talking at length of "when I am prime minister". Randolph, who had been lucky not to be named in court as one of her lovers, also comforted a tearful Tilly Losch in public at Quaglino's after her divorce in 1934, to the amusement of the other diners and the waiters.

In the 1930s, Winston's overindulgence of his son was one of several causes of coolness between him and Clementine. Clementine several times threw him out of Chartwell after arguments; at one time Clementine told Randolph she hated him and never wanted to see him again.

== Early political career ==
Randolph Churchill's political career (like that of his son) was not as successful as that of his father or grandfather Lord Randolph Churchill. In an attempt to assert his own political standing he announced in January 1935 that he was a candidate in the Wavertree by-election in Liverpool; on 6 February 1935, an Independent Conservative on a platform of rearmament and opposition to Indian Home Rule. His campaign was funded by Lucy, Lady Houston, an eccentric ardent nationalist who owned the Saturday Review. In an attempt to encourage Randolph, Lady Houston sent him a poem:

When the truth is told at Wavertree
Wavertree will set India free
And Socialist Mac will be up a tree
With all his lies and hypocrisy
Your Indian kinsfolk from over the sea
Are crying to thee
To save them from horrors you cannot see
Gallant Randolph can set them free
For Randolph is brave and Randolph has youth
And is boldly determined to tell the truth
Pitt was premier at twenty three
So why not he?

The poem was widely disseminated in the press – but without the unflattering references to 'Socialist Mac[Donald],' who at the time was still Prime Minister of the Conservative-dominated National Government.

His involvement was criticised by his father for splitting the official Conservative vote and letting in a winning Labour candidate, although Winston appeared to support Randolph on the hustings. Michael Foot was an eyewitness at Wavertree, where he blamed Baldwin's India policy (allowing India to impose tariffs on imported British goods) for hurting the Lancashire cotton trade. When he asked rhetorically, "And who is responsible for putting Liverpool where she is today?" a heckler shouted, "Blackburn Rovers!". "He collected 10,000 Independent votes in a few days and handed the seat on a platter to the Labour Party" as Foot later put it. The day after the Wavertree by-election the Secretary of State for India Samuel Hoare wrote to Viceroy Lord Willingdon “that little brute Randolph has done a lot of mischief … The fact that he kept our man out will undoubtedly do both Winston and him a good deal of harm in the party. The fact, however, that he got more votes than we expected is disquieting. It shows that there is a great deal of inflammable material about and it makes me nervous of future explosions.”

In March 1935, again with financial backing from Lady Houston, he sponsored an Independent Conservative candidate, Richard Findlay, also a member of the British Union of Fascists, to stand in a by-election in Norwood. This attracted no backing from MPs or the press, and Findlay lost to the official Conservative candidate, Duncan Sandys, who in September that year became Randolph's brother-in-law, marrying his sister Diana. He had a violent row with his father about Norwood; Winston did not support him in any way this time, although he was suspected by other Conservatives of having done so. Duncan Sandys was the only one of Randolph's Conservative opponents to win; Randolph soon became jealous when Sandys joined the family and Churchill warmed to him.

Having blamed Baldwin and the party organization for his loss, Randolph libelled Sir Thomas White, the leader of the Liverpool Conservatives. Over the summer he was summoned to the High Court to pay damages of £1,000; when advised that without an apology his career in politics was over, he immediately backtracked.

Randolph Churchill was an effective manipulator of the media, using his family name to obtain coverage in newspapers such as the Daily Mail. In the November 1935 general election he stood as the official Conservative candidate at Labour-held West Toxteth; reportedly he was so unwelcome that they threw bananas. The Earl of Derby lent his support, and Randolph continued to aid the Conservative campaigning across the city. He stood for Parliament a third time, as a Unionist on 10 February 1936 in a by-election at Ross and Cromarty, opposed to the National Government candidacy of Malcolm MacDonald. Randolph's campaign was funded by Lady Houston for a third time. It was long and lively, carried out in wintry conditions in which Randolph and the other candidates drove many miles over narrow mountain tracks, carrying spades in their cars to dig themselves out of snowdrifts, to reach far areas of the large constituency. Although Randolph enjoyed it all enormously, he was defeated again. This embarrassed his father, who was hoping to be offered a Cabinet position at this time.

In September 1936, at his father's behest, Randolph pursued his younger sister Sarah to the US in a vain attempt to dissuade her from marrying the much older comedian Vic Oliver.

Lady Houston had backed Randolph's three attempts to stand for Parliament. He was better backed financially than his father had ever been. This support came to a halt when she died late in 1936. Freddie Birkenhead remarked that he was "unbowed but bloody as usual". Thereafter he used his employment as a Beaverbrook/Rothermere journalist to promote his political career and to warn of the dangers of Hitler. In 1937 he tried in vain to get an invitation from Unity Mitford to meet Hitler. The diarist "Chips" Channon speculated (15 April) that if Winston Churchill were to return to office under the new prime minister Neville Chamberlain the outcome might be "an explosion of foolishness after a short time", war with Germany or even "a seat for Randolph". Churchill warned the House of Commons (19 July 1937) that there were twelve-inch Spanish howitzers trained on Gibraltar. Channon recorded that this reduced the House's sympathies for Franco, but that when the House learned that the source was "Master Randolph" (as he described him) MPs were merely amused.

Virginia Cowles first met Randolph in New York in the early 1930s. He helped her to get a visa to report from the USSR in February 1939. She praised his courage but wrote that "going out with him was like going out with a time bomb. Wherever he went an explosion seemed to follow. With a natural and brilliant gift of oratory, and a disregard for the opinions of his elders, he often held dinner parties pinned in a helpless and angry silence. I never knew a young man who had the ability to antagonise so easily." At a dinner at Blenheim for Lady Sarah Spencer-Churchill's 18th birthday in July 1939 a drunk Randolph had to be removed after behaving badly to a woman who spurned his advances and starting a row with another man over Winston's reputation. In 1937 he attended the wedding in France of Edward, Duke of Windsor and Wallis Warfield; this was at a time when the couple was facing social ostracism.

== Military service ==
=== Early war, marriage and Parliament ===
In August 1938, Randolph Churchill joined his father's old regiment, the 4th Queen's Own Hussars, receiving a commission as a second lieutenant in the supplementary reserve, and was called up for active service on 24 August 1939. He was one of the oldest of the junior officers, and not popular with his peers. In order to win a bet, he walked the 106-mile round trip from their base in Hull to York and back in under 24 hours. He was followed by a car, both to witness the event and in case his blisters became too painful to walk further, and made it with around twenty minutes to spare. To his great annoyance, his brother officers did not pay up.

On the outbreak of war, Randolph's father was appointed First Lord of the Admiralty. He sent Captain Lord Louis Mountbatten, along with Lieutenant Randolph Churchill, aboard HMS Kelly (which was based at Plymouth at the time) to Cherbourg to bring the Duke and Duchess of Windsor back to England from their exile. Randolph was on board the destroyer untidily attired in his 4th Hussars uniform; he had attached the spurs to his boots upside down. The Duke was mildly shocked and insisted on bending down to fit Randolph's spurs correctly.

Randolph was in love with Laura Charteris (she did not reciprocate) but his mistress at the time was the American actress Claire Luce, who often visited him in camp. He appears to have decided that as Winston's only son, it was his duty to marry and sire an heir in case he was killed, a common motivation among young men at the time. He quickly became engaged to Pamela Digby in late September 1939. It was rumoured that Randolph had proposed to eight women in the previous few weeks, and Pamela's friends and parents were not pleased about the match. She was charmed by Randolph's parents, both of whom warmed to her and felt she would be a good influence on him. They were married in October 1939. On their wedding night, Randolph read her chunks of Edward Gibbon's The Decline and Fall of the Roman Empire. Despite this, she became pregnant by the spring of 1940.

In May 1940, Randolph's father, to whom he remained close both politically and socially, became prime minister, just as the Battle of France was beginning. In the summer of 1940, Winston Churchill's secretary, Jock Colville, wrote (Fringes of Power p. 207) "I thought Randolph one of the most objectionable people I had ever met: noisy, self-assertive, whining and frankly unpleasant. He did not strike me as intelligent. At dinner he was anything but kind to Winston, who adores him." The polemic against appeasement Guilty Men (July 1940), in fact written anonymously by Michael Foot, Frank Owen, and Peter Howard, was wrongly attributed to Randolph Churchill.

Randolph was elected unopposed to Parliament for Preston at a wartime by-election in September 1940. Soon afterwards, his son Winston was born on 10 October 1940. During the first year of marriage, Randolph had no home of his own until Brendan Bracken found them a vicarage at Ickleford, near Hitchin, Hertfordshire. Pamela often had to ask Winston to pay Randolph's gambling debts.

=== North Africa ===
It was widely suspected, including by Randolph himself, that secret orders had been given that the 4th Hussars were not to be sent into action (they were, as soon as Randolph transferred out). Randolph transferred to No. 8 (Guards) Commando. In February 1941 they were sent out, a six-week journey via the Cape of Good Hope and the East Coast of Africa, avoiding the Central Mediterranean where the Italian navy and Axis air forces were strong. Randolph, who was still earning £1,500 per annum as a Lord Beaverbrook journalist, lost £3,000 gambling on the voyage. Pamela had to go to Beaverbrook, who refused her an advance on Randolph's salary. Declining his offer of an outright gift (it is unclear whether submitting to his sexual advances was a condition), she sold her wedding presents, including jewellery; took a job in Beaverbrook's ministry, arranging accommodation for workers being redeployed around the country; sublet her home and moved into a cheap room on the top floor of The Dorchester (a rather dangerous place to be during the Blitz). By accepting hospitality from others most evenings she was able to put her entire salary towards paying Randolph's debts. She may also have had a miscarriage at this time. The marriage was as good as over, and she soon began an affair with her future husband Averell Harriman, who was also staying at the Dorchester.

Once in Egypt, Randolph served as a General Staff (Intelligence) officer at Middle East HQ. Averell Harriman visited Randolph in Cairo in June 1941 to bring him news of his family. Randolph, who himself had a long-term mistress and several casual girlfriends at the time, had no idea yet that he was being cuckolded. He had recently been reduced to tears on being told to his face by a brother officer how deeply disliked he was, something of which he had previously had no idea. On 28 October 1941 he was promoted to the war-substantive rank of captain (acting rank of major) and put in charge of Army information at GHQ. For a time he edited a newspaper, Desert News, for the troops. He lived at Shepheard's Hotel. Anita Leslie, then in an ambulance company, wrote that "he could not cease trumpeting his opinions and older men could be seen turning purple with anger" and that he was "insufferable".

On leave in January 1942, he criticised the Tories for exculpating Winston Churchill's decision to defend Greece and Crete. He was sensitive to the "co-operation and self-sacrifice" of parts of the Empire that in 1942 were in more immediate danger than the British Isles, mentioning Australia and Malaya which suffered under Japanese threats of invasion. He was scathing of Sir Herbert Williams' Official Report into the Conduct of the War.

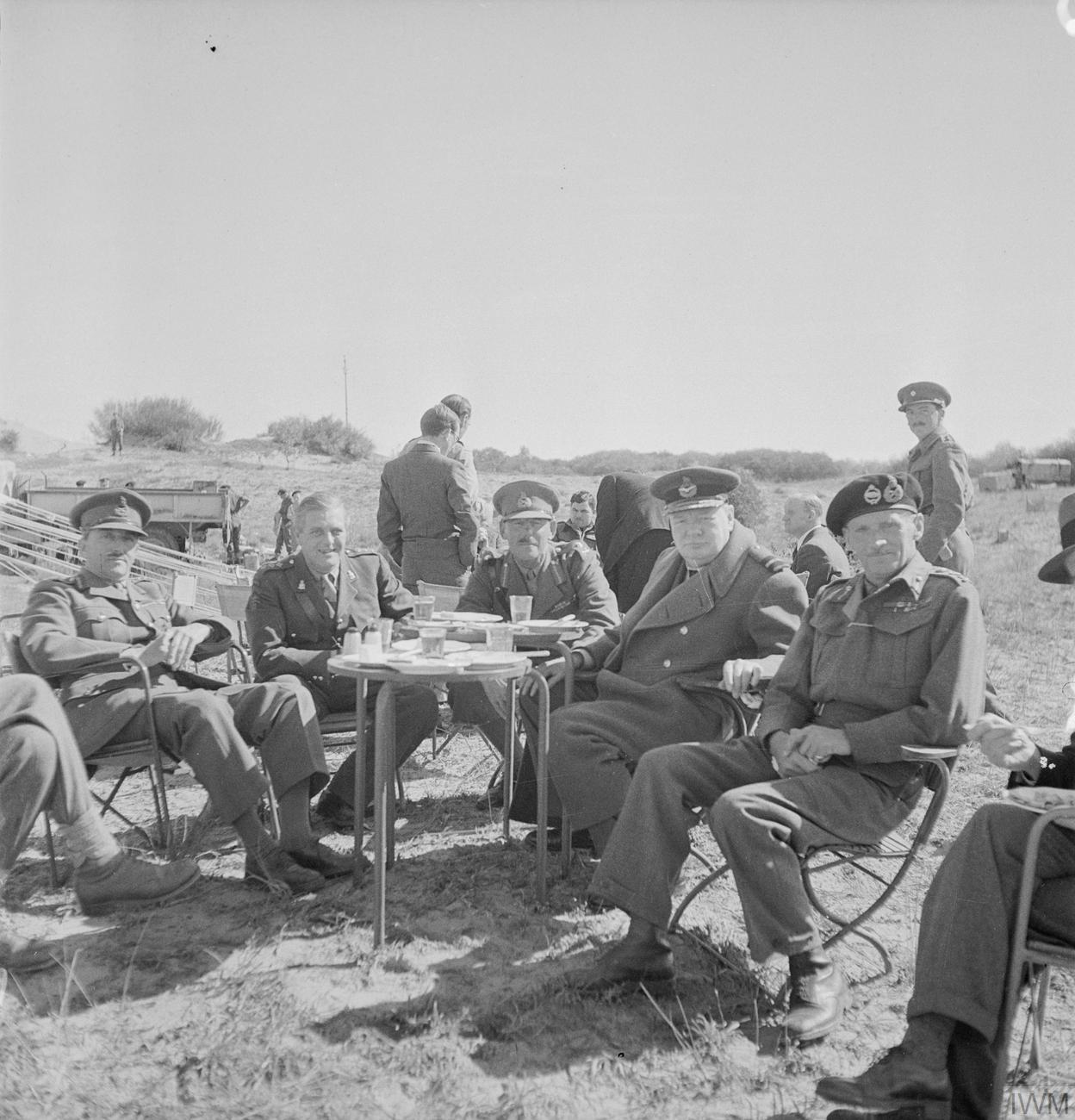
From left to right, General Sir Alan Brooke, Major Randolph Churchill, Lieutenant-General Sir Oliver Leese, Prime Minister Winston Churchill and General Sir Bernard Montgomery, having an alfresco lunch during Prime Minister Churchill's visit to Tripoli, February 1943. Standing behind Montgomery is Leese's aide-de-camp, Ion Calvocoressi.

His father, who was under great stress following recent Japanese victories in the Far East, visited him briefly in Cairo in spring 1942. Randolph had a row with his parents so violent that Clementine thought Winston might have a seizure. In April 1942 he volunteered for the newly formed SAS – to his mother's dismay, because of the strain on his father. She contemplated cabling him forbidding him to go, but knew that Winston would want him to. He joined the SAS CO David Stirling and six SAS men on a mission behind enemy lines in the Libyan Desert to Benghazi in May 1942. (Note: Although the enlisted ranks of the SAS were made up of picked men, some of the officers were appointed on the basis of social connections, such as membership of White's Club. The same was true of the Royal Marine Commandos, in which Churchill's colleague Evelyn Waugh served.) The Benghazi Raid did not reach its goals and Randolph severely dislocated his back when his truck overturned in a road accident during the journey home. After a stay in Cairo he was invalided back to England. Randolph had sent few letters to Pamela, and many to Laura Charteris, with whom he was in love and who was in the process of getting divorced. Evelyn Waugh recorded that Pamela "hates him so much that she can't sit in a room with him". By November 1942 Randolph had formally left her; his parents, who adored their baby grandson Winston, sympathised with Pamela.

In November 1942 he visited Morocco to witness the American landings. Randolph encouraged the conversion of Vichy fighters to de Gaulle's army, submitting reports to Parliament on 23 February 1943. In May 1943 Randolph visited his father in Algiers, where he was celebrating the successful conclusion of the Tunisian Campaign. Randolph, along with his sister Sarah, accompanied his father to the Tehran Conference in November 1943. On the way back they quarrelled again about his failed marriage, which may have contributed to the serious heart attack which Winston Churchill suffered at Tunis. He visited his father, who was laid up with pneumonia, in Marrakesh in December 1943 (General Alexander gave him a lift on his plane). He was promoted to the temporary rank of major on 9 December.

=== Yugoslavia ===
Randolph had encountered Fitzroy Maclean in the Western Desert Campaign. Winston Churchill agreed to Randolph accepting Maclean's offer to join his military and diplomatic mission (Macmis) to Tito's Partisans in Yugoslavia, warning him not to get captured in case the Gestapo sent him Randolph's fingers one by one. He returned to England for training then on January 20, 1944 he parachuted into Yugoslavia. Tom Mitford was also present in the group. He was later joined in Yugoslavia by Evelyn Waugh and Freddie Birkenhead. Round about this time he lost a bet to read various books of the Bible without speaking, but never paid up.

After the German airdrop outside Tito's Drvar headquarters in June 1944 ("Operation Knight's Leap") Randolph was awarded the MBE in August, having been recommended for a Military Cross. Fitzroy Maclean reported highly of his abilities at this stage. However, Maclean wrote of their adventures together, and some of the problems Churchill caused him, in his memoir Eastern Approaches. Tito had barely managed to evade the Germans and Churchill and Evelyn Waugh arrived on the island of Vis and met him on 10 July. In July 1944 he and Waugh were among the ten survivors of a Dakota crash. He suffered spinal and knee injuries. He cried when he learned that his servant had been killed, but behaved with "his usual loud rudeness" as an invalid. After discharge from hospital in Bari (in the "heel" of Italy), he convalesced with Duff and Diana Cooper in Algiers. His father visited him in Algiers on his way to Italy—they discussed French and British politics.

Randolph was ordered by Maclean to take charge of the military mission in Croatia. By September he was back in Yugoslavia, where Waugh recorded that he was drunk most days, needed to have things repeated back to him when sober, and behaved awfully even when sober. Waugh described him as "a flabby bully who rejoices in blustering and shouting down anyone weaker than himself and starts squealing as soon as he meets anyone as strong—he is a bore—with no intellectual invention or agility. He has a childlike retentive memory, and repetition takes the place of thought. He has set himself very low aims and has not the self-control to pursue them steadfastly." Lovell wrote that every observer, including Duff Cooper and Anita Leslie, recorded frequent "drunken ranting" from him at this period. On good days he could be excellent company. With Waugh he established a military mission at Topusko on 16 September 1944. One outcome was a formidable report detailing Tito's persecution of the clergy. It was "buried" by Foreign Secretary Anthony Eden (who also attempted to discredit Waugh) to save diplomatic embarrassment, as Tito was then seen as a required ally of Britain and an official "friend".

Tom Mitford, one of Randolph's few close friends, was killed in Burma, where the campaign was approaching its final stages, in March 1945.

=== Post-war military career ===
Having been demobilised with the war-substantive rank of captain, Randolph received a reserve commission in the 4th Hussars as a second lieutenant on 28 May 1946. He was promoted to captain on 1 November 1947, and remained in the reserves for the next 14 years. He relinquished his commission on 28 May 1961, retiring an honorary major.

== Loss of parliamentary seat ==
Randolph's attendance in the Commons was irregular and patchy, which may have contributed to his defeat in July 1945. He had assumed he would hold his seat in 1945, but did not (he never actually won a contested election to Parliament).

Randolph had a blazing row with his father and Brendan Bracken at a dinner at Claridge's on 31 August. The argument was about his father's planned war memoirs, and Randolph stalked off from the table as he disliked being spoken to abruptly by his father in public. His father had misunderstood him to be talking about getting the help of a literary agent, whereas Randolph was in fact urging his father to get tax advice from lawyers, as indeed he eventually did. Randolph had to write later that day explaining himself.

== Second marriage ==
Randolph was divorced from Pamela in 1946. His sister writes that after the war he led a "rampaging existence" as "he always had lances to break, and hares to start". He was loyal and affectionate, but "would pick an argument with a chair". Winston declared that he had a "deep animal love" for Randolph but that "every time we meet we seem to have a bloody row". Randolph believed that he could control his temper by willpower, but he could not do this when drunk and alcohol "fuelled his sense of thwarted destiny". His father no longer had the energy for argument, so reduced the time he spent with Randolph and the amount he confided in him. Randolph maintained good written relations with his mother, but she could not stand arguments and often retreated to her room when he visited. She was able to help him out of his financial difficulties, which he acknowledged, "spared him much humiliation".

As Winston Churchill's relations with his son cooled, he lavished affection on a series of surrogate sons, including Brendan Bracken and Randolph's brothers-in-law Duncan Sandys and, from 1947, Christopher Soames, as well as, to a certain extent, Anthony Eden. Randolph loathed all these men. He had still not entirely abandoned his youthful fantasy of one day becoming prime minister, and resented Eden's position as his father's political heir. Randolph used to refer to Eden as "Jerk Eden".

Noël Coward quipped that Randolph was "utterly unspoiled by failure". He was blackballed from the Beefsteak Club and on one occasion was slapped twice across the face by Duff Cooper at the Paris Embassy for making an obnoxious remark. He reported on the Red Army parade from Moscow. He was still trying to persuade Laura Charteris to marry him. Although they were on-off lovers, she told friends that Randolph needed a mother rather than a wife. When Randolph asked Tito for a visa to visit Yugoslavia in 1948, the request ended with "Don't you know who I am?" Tito supposedly replied "Certainly, you are Vic Oliver's ex brother-in-law".

In 1948 he tried to persuade Pamela to take him back, but she declined and, having converted to Catholicism, obtained a full annulment, soon beginning a relationship with Gianni Agnelli. Randolph accepted that he could never have Laura, with whom he had been in love for much of his adult life.

He courted June Osborne, his junior by eleven years. She was the daughter of Australia-born Colonel Rex Hamilton Osborne, D.S.O., M.C., of Little Ingleburn, Malmesbury, Wiltshire. Mary Lovell describes her as "a vulnerable and needy girl-woman". They had a stormy three-month courtship, during which at one point in June, high on a mixture of Benzedrine and wine, she ran toward the River Thames and threatened suicide, calling the police and accusing Randolph of indecent assault when he tried to prevent her. Evelyn Waugh wrote to Randolph (14 October 1948) that June "must be possessed of magnificent courage" to marry him. On 23 October he wrote to June at Randolph's request, urging her to see Randolph's good side, calling him "a domestic and home-loving character who has never had a home". Randolph and June were married in November 1948.

Randolph's son Winston, then aged eight, remembered June as "a beautiful lady with long, blonde hair" who made an effort to bond with her young stepson. Diana Cooper guessed at once after their honeymoon that Randolph and June were unsuited to one another. They had a daughter, Arabella (1949–2007). The marriage soon deteriorated; his sister Mary later wrote that "He does not seem to have possessed the aptitudes for marriage".

== 1950s ==
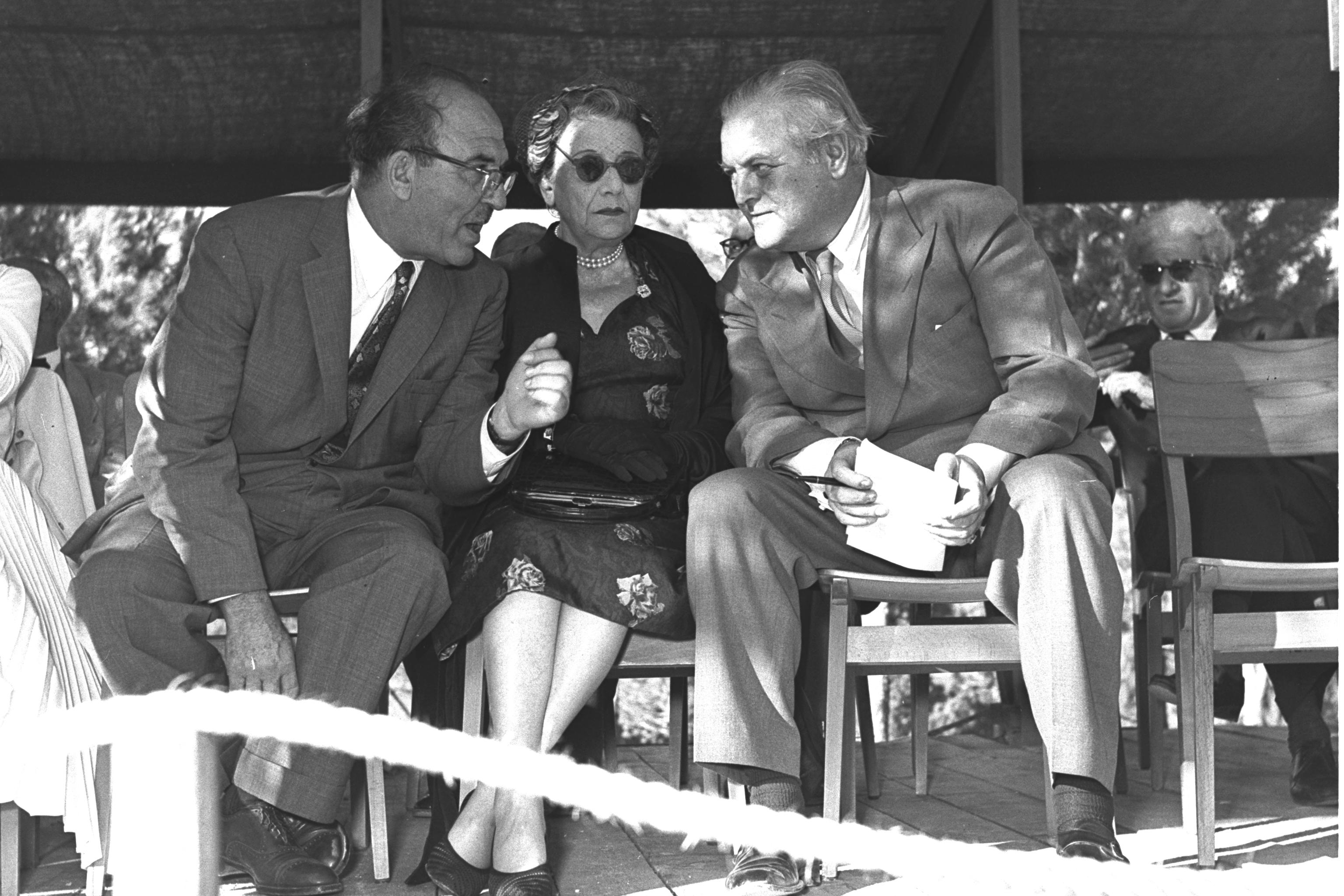
Randolph Churchill (right) with Vera Weizmann and Levi Eshkol at the dedication of the Churchill Auditorium at the Technion in Haifa, Israel.

=== Candidate for Plymouth and Korean War ===
Randolph stood unsuccessfully for the Parliamentary seat of Plymouth Devonport in February 1950. His opponent Michael Foot wrote that he talked as though Plymouth belonged to him, and issued "a brilliant cascade of abuse" in all directions, including his own party workers.

Randolph reported on the Korean War from August 1950, six weeks after the initial North Korean invasion of the south. The American and South Korean forces were bottled into a perimeter around Pusan and Taegu. His father gave him a handwritten letter of introduction to General Douglas MacArthur. This was dangerous work: 17 war correspondents were killed, either by enemy fire or in air crashes, including the correspondents of The Times and the Daily Telegraph. Randolph was wounded on patrol near the Naktong River. Before seeking treatment he insisted on finishing his copy and giving it to the crew of a plane bound for Hong Kong.

While dining in Hong Kong, he had an altercation with the restaurant staff, who then proceeded to get the manually operated lift stuck between floors, and to "accidentally" get grease on his new sharkskin suit while hauling him out. While Winston Churchill was researching his biography of his father, Alan Whicker, who had been Randolph's dining companion for the evening, confirmed the account which Randolph had given to his son at the time. He returned to Korea to report on the Inchon Landings, the liberation of Seoul and the UN forces' crossing of the 38th Parallel. He then returned to the UK for an operation on his wounded leg on 6 February 1951.

Mary Lovell records that repeated stories of Randolph's drunkenness, foul temper and financial difficulties date from this period. On one occasion, probably around this time, he became drunk and abusive in the first class cabin of a BOAC flight and was removed from the plane at the earliest opportunity (the incident was hushed up to avoid embarrassing his father). Evelyn Waugh visited him in hospital, noting that there was no sign of his wife June, and observed that he had thought his own life dull, "but when I see the alternative I am consoled".

Randolph was involved in an altercation on board a train at Nottingham on 22 February 1951. He was denied entry to the locked restaurant car by a railway employee, then later asked by the same man to leave the reserved seat in which he had been sitting. While he stood smoking in the corridor, the man (by Randolph's account) taunted him that he was "in the soup again". Randolph called the man "a bastard". At the next station Randolph was questioned by a plain-clothes policeman who had been summoned to board the train. The railwayman actually was illegitimate and he sued Randolph for slander, his lawyers arguing that it was "not in the public interest" for this fact to be revealed. The eminent barrister Sir Hartley Shawcross finally persuaded him to withdraw his lawsuit after eighteen months of correspondence.

He stood for Parliament for Devonport again in 1951. In 1951, as in 1950, Foot and Randolph exchanged invective in public, but got on well in private, often meeting for a drink at the end of the day when Randolph had been deserted by his own party workers, with whom he had a poor relationship. Foot and his wife Jill Craigie would sometimes even escort Randolph back to his train. Michael Foot later said to one of Randolph's researchers: "You and I belong to the most exclusive club in London: the friends of Randolph Churchill".

Having lost every parliamentary contest he ever fought (he had got in unopposed in 1940), he was desperately disappointed not to be able to get back into Parliament as the Conservatives returned to power.

=== Early 1950s: Winston's peacetime premiership ===
In the days after the 1951 general election, while his father was forming a government, Randolph amused himself by ringing up Conservative MPs who hurried to the phone on being told that "Mr Churchill" wished to speak to them urgently, assuming that they were about to be offered a ministerial position. During the post-war era Anthony Eden remained the Prime Minister's designated successor, yet when Eden married Clarissa Churchill in 1952, Randolph could hardly contain his utter contempt for his cousin's new husband. He dubbed his ranting phone calls the "Eden Terror". Randolph had long been jealous of Anthony Eden, and often wrote articles critical of him in the London Evening Standard. These articles helped to harm Eden's reputation. Eden did not reply in public, but complained privately to John Colville.

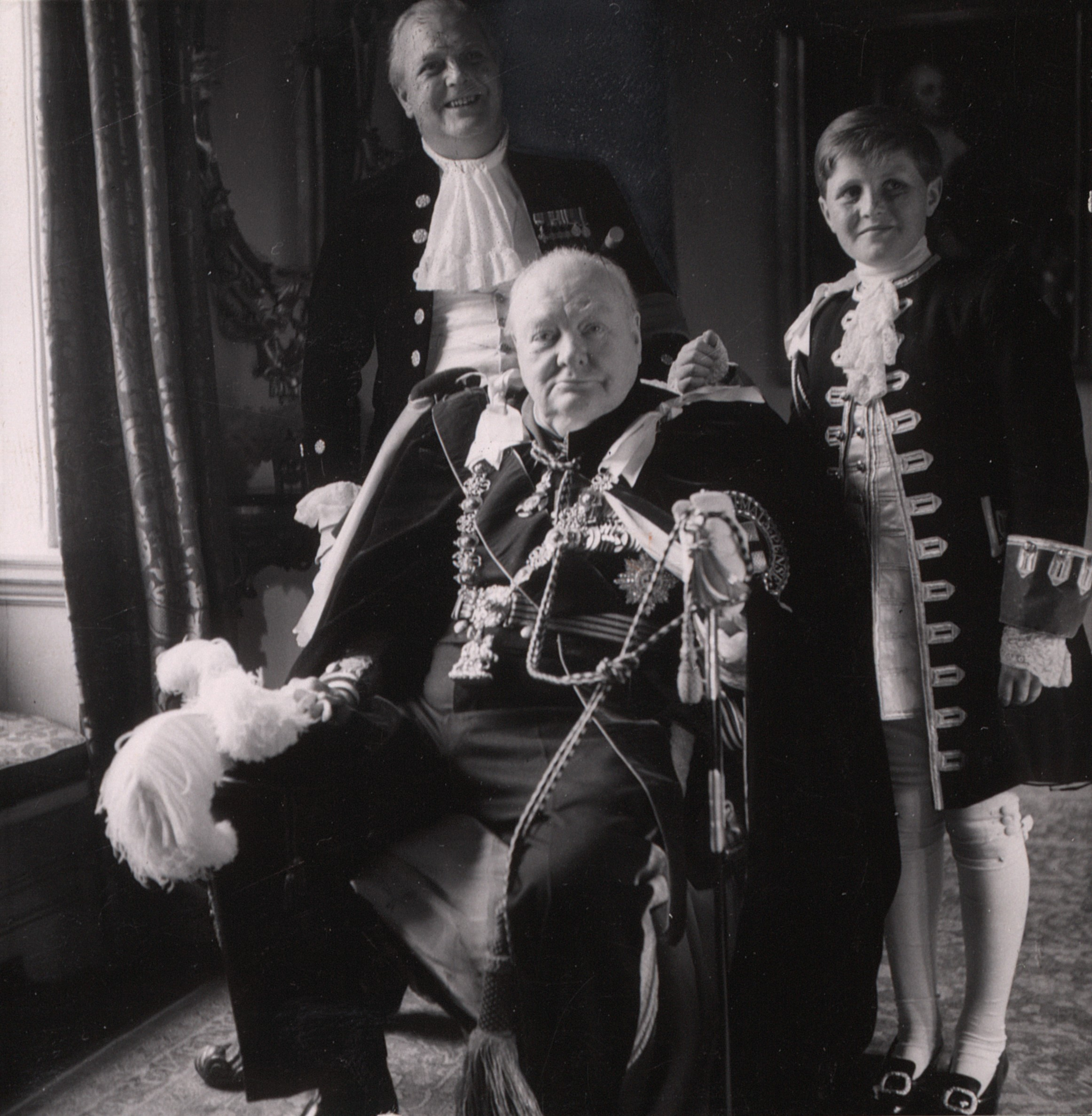
Randolph with father (seated) and son Winston, in the ceremonial robes of the Order of the Garter for the Queen's Coronation.

In 1953 Randolph was a Gold Staff Officer at the Coronation. In a speech at a Foyle's literary luncheon at the Dorchester in September 1953 Randolph, who "had had a few drinks" asked why a rich man like the press baron Lord Rothermere (his former employer) needed to "prostitute" himself by printing details about the private lives of public figures, which Randolph described as "pornography for pornography's sake". Rothermere was not initially worried by this or the next speech. Randolph repeated his accusation at the Manchester Publishing Association on 7 October 1953 and in another speech. His lawyer and Sir Hartley Shawcross had both urged him to go ahead.

When sober Randolph could still be excellent company, as even his mother admitted, and could even switch off his "temper" when told that lunch was ready. He was assisted by Alan Brien to write the life of Lord Derby; while researching it in 1953, Randolph and June lived at Oving House near Aylesbury, which got him away from White's Club and his gambling friends. The family trustees agreed to buy Stour House, East Bergholt, near Colchester. For the first time he had a proper home of his own.

However, his marriage continued to deteriorate, with occasional reports that he had blacked his wife's eye or that she had left to stay with friends, or that she had flung all her clothes out of a window. There was one furious row at Chartwell, described as "gruesome" by June and "his familiar rudeness" by Mary Lovell. He called his brother-in-law Christopher Soames "a shit" and Eden "a jerk" while his father, still prime minister at the time, was so "shaken with fury" that he seemed about to have a seizure. Randolph retired upstairs for a further noisy row with his wife, declaring that he would never see his father again. Sir Winston patched up the argument at 1am. On one occasion he reduced Queen's Restaurant in Sloane Square to silence by shouting at June over dinner that she was "a paltry little middle-class bitch always anxious to please and failing owing to her dismal manners". Eventually another diner remonstrated with him for speaking to his wife in that way; Randolph rebuked him for interfering in a private conversation, only to be told that it sounded like a public conversation to him. This may well have been the final straw, and June finally left him about a year later, in the summer of 1954.

Even on the eve of his father's resignation, Randolph told his cousin Clarissa Eden that he did not approve of her husband becoming prime minister.

Winston Churchill had declined a peerage at the end of the Second World War in 1945 (being offered the Dukedom of Dover), and then did so again on his retirement in 1955 (when he was offered the Dukedom of London), ostensibly so as not to compromise his son's political career by preventing him from serving in the House of Commons (life peerages, titles not inherited by sons, were not created until 1958). The main reason was actually that Winston himself wanted to remain in the Commons—but by 1955, when his father resigned as prime minister, Randolph's political career was "already hopeless".

=== Late 1950s ===
Randolph introduced his father to Aristotle Onassis, on whose yacht Christina he was often to cruise, in January 1956.

He set up a private company, "Country Bumpkins", to market his pamphlet "What I said about the Press" (in his speeches in 1953), which most newsagents refused to stock, and soon found himself involved in a libel case. He was carefully briefed on precise details both of facts and of the intricacies of the law. He was very quick-witted under cross-examination. His political opponent Michael Foot spoke on his behalf in court in October 1956, risking his own job on the Daily Herald. He was awarded £5,000 damages in 1958. His son writes that he had been "completely self-controlled".

There is evidence that on a trip to the US in this period, he fathered a daughter, Rhonda Noonan, in Oklahoma whom he placed for a closed adoption. Paternity has not been established since no biological relative will comment on the question or provide a DNA sample to establish a likely blood relationship.

In January 1958 June filed for divorce from Randolph. He fell in love with Natalie Bevan when she called on him, a case of the 'thunderbolt' of sudden infatuation, witnessed by Patrick Kinross who was there at the time. She was accepted as his companion by the Churchill family, visiting Chartwell, Hyde Park Gate and the Christina. Although they became lovers in the late 1950s, Natalie remained married to her husband and never lived with Randolph.

In November 1958 he gatecrashed a dinner in his father's honour at the British Embassy in Paris (Sir Winston was receiving the Croix de Liberation from Charles de Gaulle, now returned to power in France); to general relief his mother, with whom he had not spoken in two years, addressed him as "dear boy".

In November and December 1958 Randolph published six articles in the Daily Express about the Suez Crisis. Soon afterward he published The Rise and Fall of Sir Anthony Eden (1959). Questions were asked about it in the House, and Evelyn Waugh called the book "despicable". Clement Attlee reviewed the book as "singularly offensive and inaccurate" and wrote that "Readers of this book will not learn much about Sir Anthony Eden, but they should get a full appreciation of Mr Randolph Churchill". Sir Winston was deeply embarrassed about the book: Attlee later told Eden that Churchill had told him that he should have made his review stronger, while Sir Winston told Eden that he saw little of Randolph these days and that whenever they met, as Eden recorded, "they only had a flaming row. Clemmie nodded sad assent". Eden's biographer Robert Rhodes James described the book as "a diatribe ... best forgotten".

Since February 1959, as soon as it was clear that Nigel Nicolson was in trouble with his local constituency Conservative Association, Randolph's open wish to be MP for Bournemouth was the subject of much press talk. He was interviewed for the candidacy by the local Association in May, but was not placed on the shortlist. This was his last attempt to enter Parliament; it had not helped his case that in Liverpool 25 years earlier he had said "I don't want to go into Parliament to represent a lot of stuffy old ladies in Bournemouth, I want to fight for really hard-pressed people".

=== Journalism ===
Randolph inherited something of his father's literary flair, carving out a successful career for himself as a journalist. He edited the "Londoner's Diary" in the Evening Standard and was one of the best-paid gossip columnists on Fleet Street. He edited collections of his father's speeches, which were published in seven books between 1938 and 1961.

Although he had no sentimental illusions about colonial peoples, he had no time for regimes based on supposed white superiority. He reported on Cyprus (where the British Army was fighting insurgents in the late 1950s) and Algeria (where French rule was coming to an end in the late 1950s and early 1960s). He particularly disliked the Apartheid state of South Africa, and on entering the country he was detained in customs for insisting on giving his thumbprint in ink (as a black person was expected to do) rather than signing the relevant entry form, until it was confirmed that he was entitled to do so. He obtained an interview with Hendrik Verwoerd, who was surrounded by revolver-toting bodyguards after addressing a rally in Boer territory. He particularly abhorred the Sharpeville Massacre, believing that "10 London bobbies" could have dispersed the crowd relatively peacefully.

== 1960s ==
=== Natalie and relations with parents ===
In 1960 Randolph published the life of Edward Stanley, 17th Earl of Derby (described by Robert Blake as "a reputable if rather dull book" about a "dull man") to prove to the trustees of his father's papers that he was fit to write his official biography. In May 1960 Sir Winston Churchill approved of Randolph's writing his life. "At last his life had found a purpose" his son later wrote.

Natalie Bevan declined his proposal of marriage in August 1960, but by then they had settled into a stable relationship. Winston Churchill (the younger) never heard Randolph have a row with her. Jonathan Aitken and Michael Wolff were eyewitnesses to Bobby Bevan bringing Natalie over for the evening and waiting patiently downstairs while she and Randolph enjoyed a cinq à sept. His divorce from his wife June became final in 1961. The locals called him "the Beast of Bergholt" and he had a reputation for not paying small tradesmen. His researchers included Martin Gilbert, Michael Wolff, Franklin Gannon, Milo Cripps, Michael Molian, Martin Mauthner and Andrew Kerr.

Jonathan Aitken first met him at Cherkley Court, the home of Aitken's great-uncle Lord Beaverbrook, where he was having a stand-up blazing row with the journalist Hugh Cudlipp who had made the mistake of criticising his father. In the early 1960s, after they had spoken together at an Oxford Union debate the previous evening, Randolph invited Aitken to drive him back to London and join him for lunch with his parents at 28 Hyde Park Gate. After Randolph had insisted on stopping three times for drinks on the way, they arrived late and with Randolph smelling of drink. Aitken beat a hasty retreat as Randolph had a blazing row with his mother while Sir Winston, then in his late 80s, turned red, shook his legs and beat his walking sticks together with anger.

Winston Churchill's secretary Anthony Montague Browne recorded an incident on board Aristotle Onassis's yacht in June 1963, in which Randolph "erupted like Stromboli", shouting abuse at his aged father, whom he accused of having connived for political reasons with his then wife's affair with Averell Harriman during the war, and calling a female diner who attempted to intervene "a gabby doll". Browne wrote that "[n]othing short of hitting him over the head with a bottle" would have stopped him. ... I had previously discounted the tales I had heard of Randolph. Now I believed them all." Sir Winston, too old to argue back, was physically shaking with rage, so that it was feared he might have another stroke, and afterwards made clear that he wanted his son off the boat. As he was taken off the next day (Onassis had got rid of him by arranging for him to interview the King of Greece) he was in tears, declaring his love for his father.

=== Conservative leadership contest, 1963 ===
Randolph often reported on American politics, and in Washington, D.C. he often stayed with his former fiancée Kay Halle, who was by then an important Washington hostess during the Democratic administrations of the 1960s. Parties with Washington insiders were often enlivened by his displays of what Aitken describes as Randolph's "boorish aggression and drunken bad manners". The American journalist Joseph Alsop stalked off from one conversation muttering that Randolph should entitle his memoirs "How to Lose Friends and Influence Nobody".

In October 1963 he was in Washington (where he phoned through the news of Prime Minister Harold Macmillan's illness and impending resignation to President Kennedy). He flew home then travelled to Blackpool, where the Conservative Party Conference was in session. Randolph supported Lord Hailsham for the leadership rather than Macmillan's deputy Rab Butler. He knocked on the door of Butler's hotel room and urged him to withdraw from the contest, stressing the 60 telegrams which had been sent to him in support of Hailsham, many of them concocted by his team at East Bergholt. He distributed "Q" (for "Quintin", Lord Hailsham's first name) badges, pinning them on people; he tried to pin one on Lord Dilhorne's buttock without his noticing, but accidentally stabbed him with the pin, causing him to bellow with pain. After talking to Jonathan Aitken, who was working for Selwyn Lloyd at the time, he put £1,000 on the eventual winner Alec Douglas-Home at 6–1 to countervail his bet on Hailsham. Maurice Macmillan, Julian Amery and others were heard to say of Randolph's antics on behalf of Hailsham "if anyone can balls it up, Randolph can". He still hoped, somewhat unrealistically, for a peerage in Macmillan's resignation honours at the end of 1963.

In 1964 Churchill published The Fight for the Tory Leadership. The former Cabinet minister Iain Macleod wrote a review in The Spectator strongly critical of Randolph's book, and alleging that Macmillan had manipulated the process of "soundings" to ensure that Butler was not chosen as his successor. Robert Blake wrote that Randolph was "blown out of the water" by Macleod's article (17 January 1964) and "for once ... had no comeback".

=== Final years and biography of his father ===
In 1964 Randolph was laid low by bronchopneumonia which left him so frail he could only whisper. Later in the year he had a tumour, which turned out to be benign, removed from his lung. His mother visited him frequently in hospital after his lung operation. Randolph and Evelyn Waugh had barely spoken for 12 years, but they restored friendly relations that spring; Waugh commented that "It was a typical triumph of modern science to find the one part of Randolph which was not malignant and to remove it." (Note: Accounts of this incident vary. Mary Lovell writes that Waugh restored friendly relations after Randolph's bronchopneumonia, whereas his son Winston wrote that Randolph was amused at the jibe and they reconciled over this.)

At his father's funeral in January 1965 Randolph walked for an hour in the intense cold, despite being not yet fully recovered from his lung operation. After his father's death, Randolph's relations with his mother, whose approval he had always craved, mellowed a little. Randolph organised a luncheon party for her 80th birthday at the Café Royal on 1 April 1965. She often sought and took his advice. He wrote a memoir of his early life, Twenty-One Years, published in 1965.

Winston Churchill's doctor Lord Moran published The Struggle for Survival in May 1966. Randolph wrote to The Times criticising him for publishing within 16 months of his patient's death and contrary to the wishes of the family. Diana Mosley wrote to her sister Nancy Mitford that at least Moran had not told the truth about Churchill's children: "Randolph vile & making him cry" while Diana was being given electric shocks for hysteria and Sarah was frequently being arrested.

Randolph never fully recovered from his 1964 operation. By this time his health was in serious decline. He had been consuming 80–100 cigarettes and up to two bottles of whisky per day for 20 years, far in excess of his father's consumption. Drink had long since destroyed his youthful good looks. Accompanied by Natalie Bevan, he often spent winters in Marrakesh and summers in Monte Carlo, sometimes visiting Switzerland. His kidneys were failing, so he seldom drank alcohol any more, and ate little, becoming emaciated. Mary Lovell writes that "though he still behaved with the arrogance of Louis XIV he was less explosive". Natalie spent the days with him before returning to her own house after helping him to bed.

In 1966 Randolph published the first volume of the official biography of his father. He and his team of researchers carried on working on his father's biography despite his being mortally ill and it brought him fulfilment which he had not previously known. He had finished only the second volume and half a dozen companion volumes by the time of his death in 1968. Five volumes were planned (it eventually ran to eight, under the guidance of Sir Martin Gilbert).

In 1966 he signed a contract with the American politician Robert F. Kennedy to write a biography of his elder brother, President John F. Kennedy, who had been assassinated in 1963. As a consequence, Randolph obtained access to the Kennedy archives, but he died before beginning work, on the day that Robert was assassinated.

== Death ==
Randolph Churchill died of a heart attack during the night at his home, Stour House, East Bergholt, Suffolk and was found by one of his researchers the next morning, 6 June 1968. He was 57, and although he had been in poor health for years, his death was unexpected. Alistair Cooke recalled four years later that Churchill had told him the only time he would make the front page would be the day after he died. "Alas, he died the day of Robert Kennedy's assassination and he never made it."

He is buried with his parents and all four of his siblings (Marigold, who had died in infancy in 1921, was previously interred in Kensal Green Cemetery in London) at St Martin's Church, Bladon near Woodstock, Oxfordshire. His mother outlived him by almost a decade. His will was valued for probate at £70,597 (equivalent to £1,079,679 in 2025).

== Media depiction ==
H. G. Wells in The Shape of Things to Come, published in 1934, predicted a Second World War in which Britain would not participate but would vainly try to effect a peaceful compromise. In this vision, Randolph was mentioned as one of several prominent Britons delivering "brilliant pacifist speeches [which] echo throughout Europe", but fail to end the war.

Randolph Churchill was played by Nigel Havers in the Southern Television's 1981 drama series, Winston Churchill: The Wilderness Years, set in the decade Winston (played by Robert Hardy) was out of office and Randolph himself attempted to enter parliament.

In 2002, Randolph Churchill was portrayed by actor Tom Hiddleston in The Gathering Storm, the BBC – HBO co-produced television biographical film about Winston Churchill in the years just prior to World War II.

ITV TV docudrama Churchill's Secret, a screenplay based on the book The Churchill Secret: KBO by Jonathan Smith. Broadcast in 2016, it starred Michael Gambon, and depicted Winston Churchill during the summer of 1953 when he suffered a severe stroke, precipitating therapy and resignation; the character of Randolph was played by the English actor Matthew Macfadyen.

Jordan Waller portrayed Randolph Churchill in the 2017 war drama Darkest Hour.

Ian Davies portrayed him in episode 5 of the 2022 TV series SAS: Rogue Heroes.

== Works ==
=== Standalone books ===
- The Story of the Coronation (1953)
- They Serve The Queen (1953)
- Fifteen Famous English Homes (1954)
- Churchill: His Life in Photographs (1955; co-edited with Helmut Gernsheim)
- What I Said About the Press (1957)
- The Rise and Fall of Sir Anthony Eden (1959)
- Lord Derby: King of Lancashire (1959)
- The Fight for the Tory Leadership: A Contemporary Chronicle (1964; account of the 1963 Conservative leadership contest)
- Twenty-One Years (1965; autobiography of his youth)
- The Six Day War (1967; co-authored with his own son, Winston S. Churchill)

=== Edited volumes of his father's speeches ===
- Arms and The Covenant, released in the US as While England Slept (1938; speeches October 1928 to March 1938)
- Into Battle (1940; speeches May 1938 to May 1940 – the first of seven volumes of Winston Churchill's wartime speeches, although the remaining six volumes were all edited by Charles Eade; Randolph Churchill resumed editing his father's speeches for the post-war volumes)
- The Sinews of Peace (1948; speeches October 1945 to December 1946)
- Europe Unite (1950; speeches January 1947 to December 1948)
- In the Balance (1951; speeches January 1949 to December 1950)
- Stemming the Tide (1953; speeches February 1951 to December 1952)
- The Unwritten Alliance (1961; speeches January 1953 to October 1959)

=== Official biography of his father ===
- Winston S. Churchill: Volume One: Youth, 1874–1900 (1966)
- Winston S. Churchill: Volume One Companion, 1874–1900 (1966, in two parts)
- Winston S. Churchill: Volume Two: Young Statesman, 1901–1914 (1967)
- Winston S. Churchill: Volume Two Companion, 1900–1914 (1969, in three parts; published posthumously with the assistance of Martin Gilbert, who wrote future volumes of the biography)

== See also ==
- Yugoslavia and the Allies

== Notes ==
Parliament of the United Kingdom
Preceded by Edward Cobb; Adrian Moreing	Member of Parliament for Preston; 1940–1945; With: Edward Cobb	Succeeded by Samuel Segal; John Sunderland
