= 2000 Preston by-election =

UK parliamentary by-election

- 23 November 2000
- Turnout: 29.4%
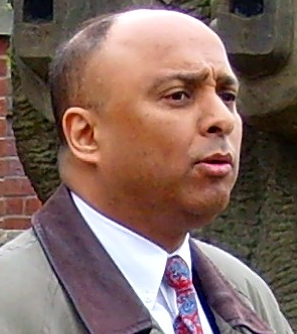
	First party	Second party
Candidate	Mark Hendrick	Graham O'Hare
Party	Labour	Conservative
Popular vote	9,765	5,339
Percentage	45.7%	25.0%
Swing	▼15.1%	▲3.1%
	Third party	Fourth party
Candidate	Bill Chadwick	Terry Cartwright
Party	Liberal Democrats	Socialist Alliance
Popular vote	3,454	1,210
Percentage	16.2%	5.7%
Swing	▲1.5%	New
MP before election
Audrey Wise
Labour
Elected MP
Mark Hendrick
Labour

A by-election for the United Kingdom parliamentary constituency of Preston was held on 23 November 2000, following the death of incumbent Labour Party Member of Parliament (MP) Audrey Wise. Labour candidate Mark Hendrick won the by-election, holding the seat comfortably albeit with a reduced vote share.

It was held on the same day as by-elections in Glasgow Anniesland and West Bromwich West, both also won by Labour.

== Background ==
Incumbent Labour Party MP Audrey Wise died on 2 September 2000, triggering a by-election to fill the seat. She had been the constituency's MP since 1987, and had previously served as MP for Coventry South West from 1974 to 1979.

== Result ==
2000 Preston by-election
Party	Candidate	Votes	%	±%
Labour	Mark Hendrick	9,765	45.7	−15.1
Conservative	Graham O'Hare	5,339	25.0	+3.1
Liberal Democrats	Bill Chadwick	3,454	16.2	+1.5
Socialist Alliance	Terry Cartwright	1,210	5.7	New
UKIP	Gregg Beaman	458	2.1	New
Green	Richard Merrick	441	2.1	New
CPA	Peter Garrett	416	2.0	New
BNP	Chris Jackson	229	1.1	New
Independent	David Franklin-Braid	51	0.2	New
Majority		4,426	20.7	−18.2
Turnout		21,363	29.4	−36.4
Labour hold		Swing	-9.1	

== Previous result (1997 general election) ==
General election 1997: Preston
Party	Candidate	Votes	%	±%
Labour	Audrey Wise	29,220	60.8	+6.5
Conservative	Paul Gray	10,540	21.9	−5.9
Liberal Democrats	Bill Chadwick	7,045	14.7	−2.5
Referendum	John Porter	924	1.9	New
Natural Law	John Ashforth	345	0.7	0.0
Majority		18,680	38.9	+12.4
Turnout		48,074	65.8	−5.9
Labour hold		Swing	+6.2	

== See also ==
- Preston (UK Parliament constituency)
- Preston
- 1915 Preston by-election
- 1929 Preston by-election
- 1936 Preston by-election
- 1940 Preston by-election
- 1946 Preston by-election
- Lists of United Kingdom by-elections
