= Edward Shackleton, Baron Shackleton =

British geographer and politician (1911–1994)

The Right Honourable The Lord Shackleton KG AC OBE PC FRS FRGS FRCGS
- 1969 photograph, by Godfrey Argent

Leader of the Opposition in the House of Lords Shadow Leader of the House of Lords
- In office 19 June 1970 – 4 March 1974
- Leader: Harold Wilson
- Preceded by: The Lord Carrington
- Succeeded by: The Lord Carrington

Leader of the House of Lords
- In office 16 January 1968 – 20 June 1970
- Monarch: Elizabeth II
- Prime Minister: Harold Wilson
- Preceded by: The Earl of Longford
- Succeeded by: The Earl Jellicoe

Lord Keeper of the Privy Seal
- In office 16 January 1968 – 6 April 1968
- Preceded by: The Earl Longford
- Succeeded by: Fred Peart
- In office 1 November 1968 – 20 June 1970
- Preceded by: Fred Peart
- Succeeded by: The Earl Jellicoe

Paymaster General
- In office 6 April 1968 – 1 November 1968
- Preceded by: George Wigg
- Succeeded by: Judith Hart

Deputy Leader of the House of Lords
- In office 7 January 1967 – 16 January 1968
- Monarch: Elizabeth II
- Prime Minister: Harold Wilson
- Leader: The Earl of Longford
- Preceded by: The Lord Champion
- Succeeded by: The Lord Shepherd

Minister without Portfolio
- In office 7 January 1967 – 16 January 1968
- Monarch: Elizabeth II
- Prime Minister: Harold Wilson
- Preceded by: Douglas Houghton
- Succeeded by: Patrick Gordon Walker

Minister of State for the Air Force
- In office 19 October 1964 – 7 January 1967
- Monarch: Elizabeth II
- Prime Minister: Harold Wilson
- Preceded by: Hugh Fraser
- Succeeded by: Office abolished

Member of the House of Lords Lord Temporal
- In office 11 August 1958 – 22 September 1994; Life peerage

Member of Parliament for Preston South
- In office 23 February 1950 – 6 May 1955
- Preceded by: Constituency established
- Succeeded by: Alan Green

Member of Parliament for Preston
- In office 31 January 1946 – 3 February 1950
- Preceded by: John William Sunderland
- Succeeded by: Constituency abolished

Personal details
- Born: 15 July 1911 Wandsworth, London, England
- Died: 22 September 1994 (aged 83) Winchester, Hampshire, England
- Spouse: Betty Horman (m. 1938)
- Children: 2
- Parent(s): Ernest Shackleton; Emily Dorman
- Education: Magdalen College, Oxford
- Military career
- Allegiance: United Kingdom
- Branch: Royal Air Force
- Service years: 1940–1956
- Rank: Wing Commander
- Service number: 83143
- Conflicts: Second World War
- Awards: Officer of the Order of the British Empire

Edward Arthur Alexander Shackleton, Baron Shackleton (15 July 1911 – 22 September 1994) was a British geographer, Royal Air Force officer and Labour Party politician.

== Early life and career ==
Born in Wandsworth, London, Shackleton was the younger son of Emily Mary and Sir Ernest Shackleton, the Antarctic explorer. Edward Shackleton was educated at Radley College, an independent boarding school for boys in Oxfordshire, followed by Magdalen College, Oxford.

Shackleton arranged the 1932 Oxford University Exploration Club expedition to Sarawak in Borneo organised by Tom Harrisson. During this trip, he made the first ascent of Mount Mulu.

In 1934 Shackleton organised the Oxford University Ellesmere Land Expedition and chose Gordon Noel Humphreys to lead it. Shackleton accompanied the party as assistant surveyor to Humphreys. The expedition was eventually responsible for naming Mount Oxford (after the University of Oxford) and the British Empire Range. On leaving the university, he worked as a Talks Producer for the BBC in Northern Ireland – an experience that turned him away from the Conservatives towards Labour.

=== Royal Air Force service ===
Shackleton served in the Royal Air Force (RAF) during the Second World War. On 29 July 1940, he was commissioned into the Administrative and Special Duties Branch, Royal Air Force Volunteer Reserve, as a pilot officer on probation. On 1 March 1941, he was promoted and granted the war substantive rank of flying officer. Following the probationary period, his commission was confirmed on 29 July 1941. He was promoted to flight lieutenant (temporary) on 1 September 1942, and made a war substantive flight lieutenant on 15 February 1944. He was an acting squadron leader by June 1944, and an acting wing commander by June 1945.

In 1944, Shackleton was mentioned in despatches. In the 1945 King's Birthday Honours, he was appointed an Officer of the Order of the British Empire (OBE).

Shackleton relinquished his commission on 15 July 1956 and was granted permission to retain the rank of wing commander.

== Political life ==
Shackleton stood unsuccessfully for Labour at Epsom in the 1945 general election and in the 1945 Bournemouth by-election. In 1946, he was elected for Labour as Member of Parliament for Preston in a by-election. In 1949 he was appointed as Parliamentary Private Secretary (PPS) to the Minister of Supply, George Strauss.

A boundary change divided Preston into two seats, and in 1950 Shackleton was elected as MP for Preston South on a much-reduced majority. In the following year he was promoted to be PPS to Lord President of the Council and Foreign Secretary Herbert Morrison, one of the heavyweight political figures in the post-war government. He was re-elected in 1951.

At the 1955 election, he was defeated. Hugh Gaitskell recommended Shackleton to the Prime Minister, and on 11 August 1958 he was created a life peer by letters patent as Baron Shackleton, of Burley in the County of Southampton. Shackleton delivered his maiden speech in the House of Lords on 11 November 1958, in a debate on a Wages Councils bill, one he thoroughly approved of and welcomed, to increase understanding between unions and management.

In Harold Wilson's government, he served as Minister of Defence for the RAF from 1964 to 1967. He was sworn of the Privy Council in 1966 and made Deputy Leader of the House of Lords a year later. As Minister without Portfolio in 1967–1968 and Paymaster General in 1968, he had a seat in the Cabinet. During the Aden Emergency he was sent on a Special Mission as British Resident to help with the British withdrawal.

In April 1968, after the budget, Wilson made Shackleton Leader of the House of Lords, succeeding the Earl of Longford.

Shackleton was active in Wilson's proposals for House of Lords reform, designed to reduce the delaying powers of the Lords from two years to just six months, and he liaised between committees and sub-committees, but in April 1969 Wilson dropped the bill to "concentrate on priorities". Sitting on the committee for Civil Service Reform, Shackleton successfully widened access to entry for scientists.

Shackleton remained Leader of the House of Lords until a Conservative government was elected in 1970 and thereafter was Opposition Leader in the Lords.

From 1971, Shackleton was President of the Royal Geographical Society. Lord Shackleton was appointed a Knight Companion of the Order of the Garter in 1974. From 1976 until 1992 he was Chairman of the joint-Political Honours and Scrutiny Committee. Lord Shackleton's report, commissioned by James Callaghan, described the economic future of the Falkland Islands, the value of the being British to the islanders, and how their lot could be improved. It included the invaluable role eventually played by HMS Endurance.

Between 1988 and 1989 he chaired the Lords Science and Technology Committee and in 1989 was elected a Fellow of the Royal Society under Statute 12, effectively an honorary fellow. He also served as Chairman of the East European Trade Council

In 1990 Shackleton was appointed an honorary Companion of the Order of Australia (AC), Australia's highest civilian honour, "for service to Australian/British relations, particularly through the Britain–Australia Society.

Lord Shackleton was Pro-Chancellor of the University of Southampton, in which role he was deeply interested in the development of geography at Southampton. A portrait photograph of Lord Shackleton was unveiled by his daughter Alexandra Shackleton in December 1997 in the university's Shackleton Building, which houses the Departments of Geography and Psychology.

In 1994 he became the Life President of the newly founded James Caird Society, named after the boat in which his explorer father and crew escaped Antarctica (itself, in turn, named for James Key Caird [1837–1916], jute baron and philanthropist). He acted also as patron of the British Schools Exploring Society (B.S.E.S.) from 1962 until his death in Winchester.

== Personal life ==
In 1938 Shackleton married Betty Homan, and they had two children, Alexandra (born 1940) and Charles (1942–1979).

== Arms ==
Coat of arms of Edward Shackleton, Baron Shackleton
Crest A Poplar Tree proper charged with a Buckle as in the arms Escutcheon Or on a Fess Gules three Lozengy Buckles tongues palewise of the field, on a Canton of the second a Cross Humettée of the field. Motto FORTITUDINE VINCIMIS (By Endurance We Conquer) Orders Order of the Garter (Appointed 23 April 1974)

Lord Shackleton's Garter banner, which hung in St. George's Chapel in Windsor during his lifetime, is now on display in Christ Church Cathedral, Falkland Islands.

== Bibliography ==
- Hattersley-Smith, Geoffrey. Geographical Names of the Ellesmere Island National Park Reserve and Vicinity. Calgary, Alberta, Canada: Arctic Institute of North America, 1998. ISBN 0-919034-96-9.

Parliament of the United Kingdom
Preceded by John Sunderland; Samuel Segal	Member of Parliament for Preston; 1946–1950; With: Samuel Segal	Constituency abolished
New constituency	Member of Parliament for Preston South; 1950–1955	Succeeded by Alan Green
Political offices
Preceded by Hugh Charles Fraser	Secretary of State for Air; 1964–1966	Office abolished
Preceded by The Lord Champion	Deputy Leader of the House of Lords; 1967–1968	Succeeded by The Lord Shepherd
Preceded by The Earl of Longford	Lord Privy Seal; 1968	Succeeded by Fred Peart
Vacant Title last held by George Wigg	Paymaster General; 1968	Succeeded by Judith Hart
Preceded by The Earl of Longford	Leader of the House of Lords; 1968–1970	Succeeded by The Earl Jellicoe
Preceded by Fred Peart	Lord Privy Seal; 1968–1970	Succeeded by The Earl Jellicoe
Party political offices
Preceded by The Earl of Longford	Leader of the Labour Party in the House of Lords; 1968–1974	Succeeded by The Lord Shepherd
Honorary titles
Preceded by The Baroness Wootton of Abinger	Senior life peer 1988–1994	Succeeded by The Lord Shawcross
