= Alan Green (Conservative politician) =

British politician (1911–1991)

Alan Green CBE (29 September 1911 – 2 February 1991) was a British Conservative Party politician.

Green was educated at Brighton College and the University of London. In 1935 he joined a Blackburn manufacturer as a manager, and became a company director and a member of a firm of textile engineers. He volunteered for the British Army at the outbreak of World War II and was commissioned into the Royal Artillery in 1942, serving in the Middle East and attaining the rank of Major.

Green contested Nelson and Colne in 1950 and 1951. He was twice Member of Parliament for the marginal Preston South constituency, from the 1955 general election until he lost his seat at the 1964 election and again from the 1970 election until his second defeat at the February 1974 election. At the end of both terms he lost to the Labour candidate, on the latter occasion to Stan Thorne.

Green was a junior government minister, serving as Parliamentary Secretary to the Ministry of Labour from 1961 to 1962, Parliamentary Secretary to the Board of Trade from 1962 to 1963, and Financial Secretary to the Treasury from 1963 to 1964.

Parliament of the United Kingdom
Preceded by Edward Shackleton	Member of Parliament for Preston South; 1955–1964	Succeeded by Peter Mahon
Preceded by Peter Mahon	Member of Parliament for Preston South; 1970 – Feb 1974	Succeeded by Stan Thorne
Political offices
Preceded by Anthony Barber	Financial Secretary to the Treasury; 1963–1964	Succeeded by Niall MacDermot
