= 1929 Preston by-election =

UK parliamentary by-election

The 1929 Preston by-election was a parliamentary by-election held in England for the UK House of Commons constituency of Preston on 31 July 1929. The seat had become vacant when the Liberal Member of Parliament William Jowitt had resigned his seat after changing his party allegiance.

Standing as a Liberal, Jowitt had won one of Preston's two seats at the general election in May 1929, having previously been Liberal MP for The Hartlepools from 1922 to 1924. After his return to the Commons in 1929, he was offered the post of Attorney General for England and Wales in the new Labour Government. He accepted the post, but resigned from Parliament and stood for re-election to allow voters to decide whether to accept his change of party.

Jowitt held the seat with an increased majority. The Liberals did not put forward a candidate, being demoralised following Jowitt's defection, and also lacking funds to fight an election. They did not become a force at parliamentary level in Preston again.

Preston by-election, 1929
Party	Candidate	Votes	%	±%
Labour	William Jowitt	35,608	54.6	+25.1
Conservative	Alfred Howitt	29,168	44.8	−0.7
Independent Labour	S. M. Holden	410	0.6	−1.0
Majority		6,440	9.8	+2.0
Turnout		65,186	79.6	+1.4
Labour hold		Swing		

== See also ==
- Preston (UK Parliament constituency)
- Preston
- 1903 Preston by-election
- 1915 Preston by-election
- 1936 Preston by-election
- 1940 Preston by-election
- 1946 Preston by-election
- 2000 Preston by-election
- List of United Kingdom by-elections
