= Stan Thorne =

British politician

Stanley George Thorne (22 July 1918 – 26 November 2007) was a British Labour Party politician.

== Early life ==
Stan Thorne was born in 1918 to a dressmaker and a postman, in Donaghadee, County Down, Northern Ireland. When his family moved to Manchester, he began attending Manley Park elementary school which was followed by the attendance of Ducie Avenue central school and Manchester Junior commercial school. He finished schooling at the age of 16 and moved to Merseyside where, for the next 30 years, he worked on numerous posts such as accounts clerk, miner, machinist, signalman, office manager and civil servant. In 1968 he obtained a diploma from Ruskin College and two years later got BA Hons from the University of Liverpool. From 1970 to 1974 he was a lecturer on industrial sociology at the University of Bolton.

== Parliamentary career ==
After contesting Liverpool Wavertree in 1964, Thorne was member of parliament for Preston South from February 1974 to 1983, and, after boundary changes, for Preston from 1983 until his retirement in 1987. His successor was Audrey Wise.

== Personal life ==
Stan Thorne married Esme' Florence Grant in 1944 and together they had a daughter Barbara Joan Thorne born 1945, a son Steven Kilm Thorne born 1947 and in 1948, a second daughter Lynda Margaret Thorne was born. They divorced a few years later.

In 1952 Stan Married Catherine Rand and together had one son and one daughter.

Parliament of the United Kingdom
Preceded by Alan Green	Member of Parliament for Preston South; February 1974 – 1983	Constituency abolished
New constituency	Member of Parliament for Preston; 1983 – 1987	Succeeded by Audrey Wise
