= 1940 Preston by-election =

1940 UK parliamentary by-election

The 1940 Preston by-election was a parliamentary by-election held for the British House of Commons constituency of Preston in Lancashire on 25 September 1940. The seat had become vacant on the death of the Conservative Member of Parliament Adrian Moreing, who had held the seat since the 1931 general election.

During the Second World War, the parties in the war-time coalition government had agreed not to contest by-elections where a seat held by any of their parties fell vacant. In addition, S. M. Holden announced that he would not nominate a "British Pensions Movement" candidate. As a result, the Conservative candidate, Randolph Churchill (son of Prime Minister Winston Churchill), was returned unopposed. He represented the constituency until his defeat at the 1945 general election.

== See also ==
- Preston (UK Parliament constituency)
- Preston, Lancashire
- 1903 Preston by-election
- 1915 Preston by-election
- 1929 Preston by-election
- 1936 Preston by-election
- 1946 Preston by-election
- 2000 Preston by-election
- List of United Kingdom by-elections
