= Edward Cobb (politician) =

British politician (1891–1957)

Edward Charles Cobb (4 September 1891 – 14 May 1957) was an English Conservative Party politician. He was elected as Member of Parliament (MP) for Preston at a by-election in 1936, and held the seat until the 1945 general election when he was defeated at Eton & Slough.

Cobb was the third son of George Arthur Cobb of Lively Island in the Falkland Islands. Educated at St. Paul's School and at Royal Military College, Sandhurst, he was commissioned as a 2nd Lieutenant in the Northamptonshire Regiment in 1911. He served in the Cameroons Expeditionary Force and during the First World War in the British Expeditionary Force 1914-16. He was awarded the Distinguished Service Order in 1916 and retired from the army in 1924. He married Gladys Ryder, daughter of H. J. King of Poles in Hertfordshire. A member of the London County Council 1925–34, he was chairman of the Education Committee 1932–34. He also served as a Justice of the Peace for Sussex.

As an MP, Cobb served as Parliamentary Private Secretary to Harold Balfour 1938–39, then to Oliver Stanley 1939-40 and to Leo Amery 1940–41. After nine years as MP for Preston, he relocated in 1945 and unsuccessfully contested the Eton and Slough division of Buckinghamshire. He was again defeated in Eton and Slough in February 1950.

== Sources ==
- Who's Who of British Members of Parliament
- Craig, F. W. S. (1983) [1969]. British parliamentary election results 1918-1949 (3rd ed.). Chichester: Parliamentary Research Services. ISBN 0-900178-06-X.
- Leigh Rayment's Historical List of MPs

Parliament of the United Kingdom
Preceded by Adrian Moreing and William Kirkpatrick	Member of Parliament for Preston; 1936–1945; With: Adrian Moreing, to 1940; Randolph Churchill, from 1940	Succeeded by Samuel Segal and John Sunderland
