= Adrian Moreing =

British politician (1892–1940)

Adrian Charles Moreing

Member of Parliament for Preston
- In office 1931–1940 Serving with William Kirkpatrick (1931–36); Edward Cobb (1936–45)
- Preceded by: William Jowitt and Tom Shaw
- Succeeded by: Randolph Churchill and Edward Cobb

Personal details
- Born: 4 July 1892 Paddington, London, England
- Died: 10 July 1940 (aged 48) Esher, Surrey, England
- Party: Conservative
- Spouse(s): Jean Brunton (m. 1916) Dorothy Haworth (m. 1934)
- Parent: Charles Algernon Moreing (father)
- Relatives: Algernon Moreing (brother)
- Education: Winchester College
- Alma mater: Trinity College, Cambridge
- Military career
- Allegiance: United Kingdom
- Branch: British Army
- Service years: 1914–1918
- Rank: Captain
- Unit: London Regiment
- Conflicts: World War I; Western Front

Adrian Charles Moreing (4 July 1892 – 10 July 1940) was a British Conservative Party politician.

Moreing was born in July 1892 in Paddington, London, he was the younger son of Charles Algernon Moreing, a civil and mining engineer originally from New South Wales, Australia and the principal in the worldwide mining consulting firm of Bewick, Moreing and Company.

Educated at Winchester College and Trinity College, Cambridge, he entered the Inner Temple to study for the bar. He did not become a barrister, instead becoming a solicitor. He was a partner in his father's firm.

The firm had two years before Adrian's birth sent a young graduate of Stanford University, Herbert Hoover, then age 23, to Western Australia to look for gold, which Hoover found, in the sense that he realized the Sons of Gwalia Mine could be scaled up to reap enormous profit.

Moreing travelled much of the world in connection with his firm's mining interests and was a director of a number of mining companies.

Early in the First World War he received a commission into the 3rd London Regiment (Royal Fusiliers), Territorial Force, and first entered France with its 1st Battalion's arrival on the Western Front in January 1915. He was discharged at the end of his military career with the rank of captain.

He was married twice, first to Jean Brunton in 1916. In 1934 he married Dorothy Haworth of Samlesbury, Lancashire.

Moreing was a Municipal Reform Party councillor on the London County Council representing St Pancras South West from 1925 to 1934. From 1927 to 1934 he was the party's whip on the council. He was the council's representative on the Port of London Authority.

He was elected as Member of Parliament (MP) for Preston at the 1931 general election, and held the seat until his death. He died in July 1940 aged 48, in Esher, Surrey. In the resulting by-election, Randolph Churchill (son of the Prime Minister Winston Churchill) was returned unopposed.

== See also ==
- Algernon Henry Moreing

Parliament of the United Kingdom
Preceded by William Jowitt and Tom Shaw	Member of Parliament for Preston; 1931–1940; With: William Kirkpatrick, 1931–1936; Edward Cobb, 1936–1945	Succeeded by Randolph Churchill and Edward Cobb
