= Preston South =

Parliamentary constituency in the United Kingdom, 1950–1983

- Former borough constituency for the House of Commons
- Preston South in Lancashire, showing boundaries used from 1974-1983
- County: Lancashire
- Major settlements: Preston

1950–1983
- Seats: One
- Created from: Preston
- Replaced by: Preston and South Ribble

Preston South was a parliamentary constituency in the city of Preston in Lancashire. It returned one Member of Parliament (MP) to the House of Commons of the Parliament of the United Kingdom.

The constituency was created by the House of Commons (Redistribution of Seats) Act 1949 for the 1950 general election, and abolished for the 1983 general election. From the 1983 election onwards, the areas covered by Preston South were moved to Preston and South Ribble.

== Boundaries ==
1950–1964: The County Borough of Preston wards of Ashton, Avenham, Christ Church, Maudland, St. John's, St. Peters, and Trinity, and the urban district of Walton-le-Dale.

1964–1974: The County Borough of Preston wards of Ashton, Avenham, Central, St. John's, Savick, and Tulketh, and the urban district of Walton-le-Dale.

== Members of Parliament ==
Election	Member	Party
1950	Edward Shackleton	Labour
1955	Alan Green	Conservative
1964	Peter Mahon	Labour
1970	Alan Green	Conservative
Feb 1974	Stan Thorne	Labour
1983	constituency abolished: see Preston	

== Election results ==
=== Elections in the 1950s ===
General election 1950: Preston South
Party	Candidate	Votes	%	±%
Labour	Edward Shackleton	22,716	50.2	N/A
Conservative	Neil McLean	22,567	49.8	N/A
Majority		149	0.4	N/A
Turnout		45,283	85.3	N/A
Labour win (new seat)				

General election 1951: Preston South
Party	Candidate	Votes	%	±%
Labour	Edward Shackleton	22,760	50.0	―0.2
Conservative	Neil McLean	22,744	50.0	+0.2
Majority		16	0.0	―0.4
Turnout		45,504	86.5	+1.2
Labour hold		Swing	―0.2	

General election 1955: Preston South
Party	Candidate	Votes	%	±%
Conservative	Alan Green	21,497	50.6	+0.6
Labour	Edward Shackleton	21,023	49.4	―0.6
Majority		474	1.2	N/A
Turnout		42,520	81.9	―4.6
Conservative gain from Labour		Swing	+0.6	

General election 1959: Preston South
Party	Candidate	Votes	%	±%
Conservative	Alan Green	21,954	53.7	+3.1
Labour	Tom Bradley	18,935	46.3	―3.1
Majority		3,019	7.4	+6.2
Turnout		40,889	82.1	+0.2
Conservative hold		Swing	+3.1	

=== Elections in the 1960s ===
General election 1964: Preston South
Party	Candidate	Votes	%	±%
Labour	Peter Mahon	19,352	50.4	+4.1
Conservative	Alan Green	19,004	49.6	―4.1
Majority		348	0.8	N/A
Turnout		38,356	78.8	―3.3
Labour gain from Conservative		Swing	+4.1	

General election 1966: Preston South
Party	Candidate	Votes	%	±%
Labour	Peter Mahon	20,720	53.6	+3.1
Conservative	Alan Green	17,931	46.4	―3.2
Majority		2,789	7.2	+6.3
Turnout		38,651	80.0	+1.2
Labour hold		Swing	+3.2	

=== Elections in the 1970s ===
General election 1970: Preston South
Party	Candidate	Votes	%	±%
Conservative	Alan Green	20,480	51.7	+5.3
Labour	Peter Mahon	19,149	48.3	―5.3
Majority		1,331	3.4	N/A
Turnout		39,629	75.9	―4.1
Conservative gain from Labour		Swing	+5.3	

General election February 1974: Preston South
Party	Candidate	Votes	%	±%
Labour	Stan Thorne	17,354	42.5	―5.8
Conservative	Alan Green	15,467	37.9	―13.8
Liberal	Ronald Philip Marshall	7,974	19.6	New
Majority		1,887	4.6	N/A
Turnout		40,795	79.8	+3.9
Labour gain from Conservative		Swing	+4.0	

General election October 1974: Preston South
Party	Candidate	Votes	%	±%
Labour	Stan Thorne	18,449	46.9	+4.4
Conservative	Alan Green	14,700	37.4	―0.5
Liberal	Ronald Philip Marshall	5,456	13.9	―5.7
National Front	Edward Victor Harrison	663	1.7	New
More Prosperous Britain	Harold Smith	87	0.2	New
Majority		3,749	9.5	+4.9
Turnout		39,355	76.4	―3.4
Labour hold		Swing	+2.5	

General election 1979: Preston South
Party	Candidate	Votes	%	±%
Labour	Stan Thorne	17,810	44.5	―2.4
Conservative	Brian Hugh Tetlow	17,189	43.0	+5.6
Liberal	Ronald Philip Marshall	4,625	11.6	―2.3
National Front	Michael Sydney Carl Gibson	258	0.7	―1.0
Workers Revolutionary	Victor Anthony Stephens	116	0.3	New
Majority		621	1.5	―8.0
Turnout		39,998	77.2	+0.8
Labour hold		Swing	―4.0	
