= Mark Hendrick =

British Labour Co-op politician

Sir Mark Hendrick MP
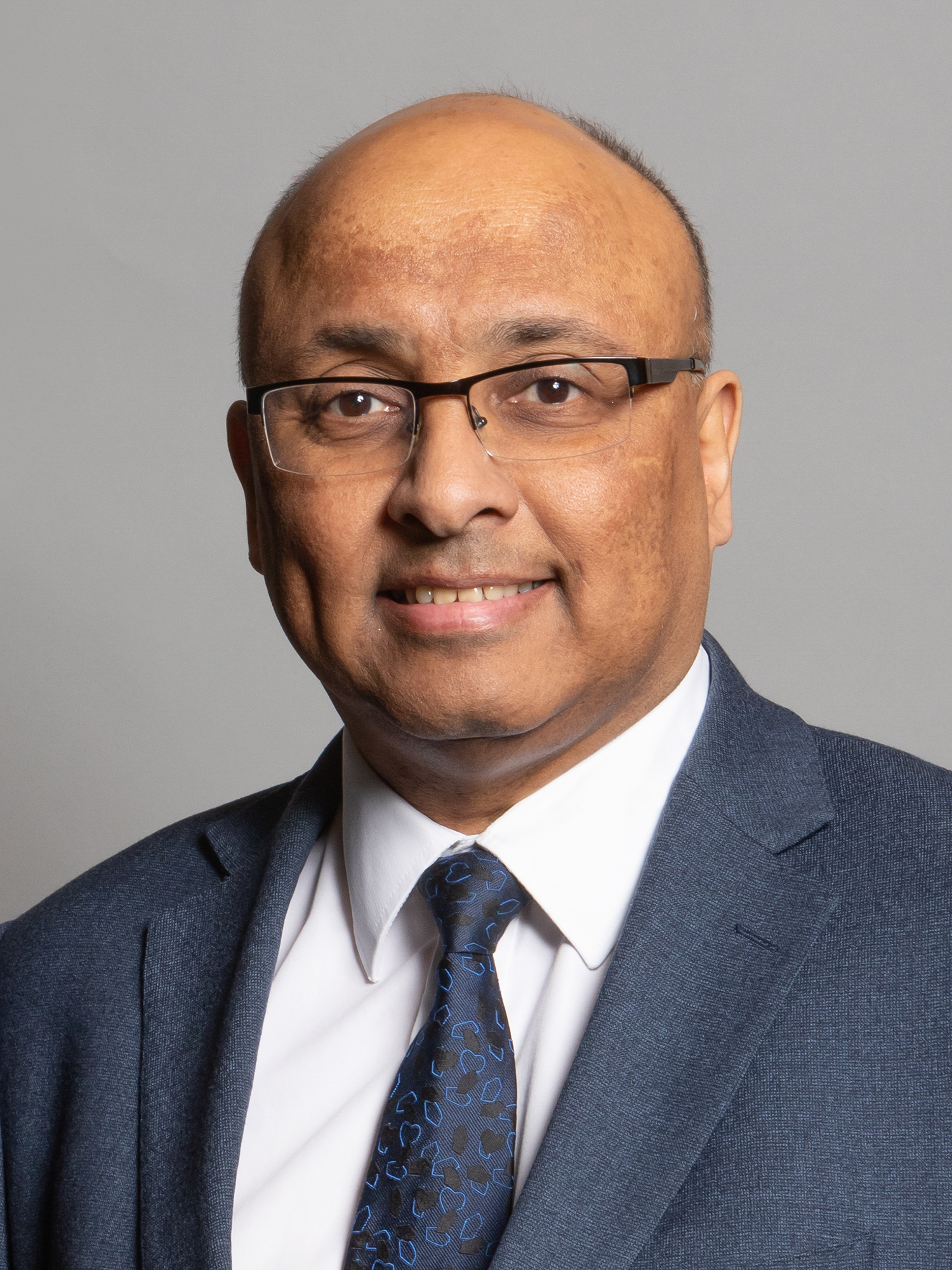
- Official portrait, 2020

Member of Parliament for Preston
- Incumbent
- Assumed office 23 November 2000
- Preceded by: Audrey Wise
- Majority: 5,291 (13.2%)

Member of the European Parliament for Lancashire Central
- In office 9 June 1994 – 10 June 1999

Member of Salford City Council for Weaste and Seedley
- In office 7 May 1987 – 9 June 1994

Personal details
- Born: Mark Phillip Hendrick; 2 November 1958 (age 67) Salford, Lancashire, England
- Party: Labour Co-op
- Education: Liverpool Polytechnic (BSc); University of Manchester (MSc)
- Website: www.prestonmp.co.uk

Sir Mark Phillip Hendrick (born 2 November 1958) is a British Labour and Co-operative politician who has been the Member of Parliament (MP) for Preston since 2000. Hendrick was previously elected to the Lancashire Central constituency as a Member of the European Parliament (MEP) from 1994 to 1999.

== Early life and education ==
Mark Hendrick was born on 2 November 1958 in Salford; he is of Anglo-Somali descent. His father worked in the timber industry. Hendrick went to Salford Grammar School and Buile Hill High School. He later attended Liverpool Polytechnic (now Liverpool John Moores University), where he completed a Bachelor of Science degree in electrical and electronic engineering. He also earned a Master of Science degree in computer science from the Department of Computer Science, University of Manchester. Hendrick is also a Chartered Engineer (CEng) and holds a Certificate in Education (CEd) (a teaching qualification) from the same institution.

== Career ==
In 1990, Hendrick joined Stockport College where he worked for four years as a lecturer in digital electronics and software design.

=== Local government ===
From 1984 to 1994, Hendrick was the Secretary of the Salford Co-operative Party. He was elected a councillor to the City of Salford Council in 1987 and served in this capacity for eight years. He was also the chairman of the Eccles Constituency Labour Party from 1990 to 1994.

=== Member of the European Parliament ===
At the 1994 European Parliament Election, Hendrick was elected to the European Parliament as the representative for Lancashire Central. He served for five years until losing an election bid at the 1999 European Parliament Election, which was run on a regional PR list system.

== Parliamentary career ==
Hendrick was elected to Parliament as MP for Preston at the 2000 Preston by-election with 45.7% of the vote and a majority of 4,426. He was re-elected as MP for Preston at the 2001 general election with an increased vote share of 57% and an increased majority of 12,268.

In December 2002, Hendrick successfully campaigned for and achieved free access for the public to the National Football Museum then based in Preston. He campaigned for City Status for Preston, which was successful and awarded to Preston in the Queen's Golden Jubilee Awards in 2002.

At the 2005 general election, Hendrick was again re-elected, with a decreased vote share of 50.5% and a decreased majority of 9,407.

Hendrick was a member of the UK delegation to the Organization for Security and Co-Operation in Europe Parliamentary Assembly (OSCEPA) from 2008 to 2020.

He was again re-elected at the 2010 general election with a decreased vote share of 48.2% and a decreased majority of 7,733.

Hendrick was chairman of the All-Party Parliamentary Group (APPG) China from 2010 to 2012.

From November 2010 to the summer of 2012, Hendrick was appointed to the front bench by Labour Leader Ed Miliband as an opposition assistant whip. Returning to the backbenches, he was later appointed to the Foreign Affairs Select Committee from June 2012 to June 2017.

At the 2015 general election, Hendrick was again re-elected, with an increased vote share of 56% and an increased majority of 12,067. He was again re-elected at the snap 2017 general election with an increased vote share of 68% and an increased majority of 15,723.

Hendrick was appointed a Knight Bachelor in the 2018 New Year Honours for parliamentary and political service.

Hendrick was appointed to the International Trade Select Committee in July 2018 and served until 2023 when the committee was dissolved following the disbanding of the Department for International Trade.

At the 2019 general election, Hendrick was again re-elected, with a decreased vote share of 61.8% and a decreased majority of 12,146.

He was formally appointed to the Energy Security and Net Zero Select Committee on 12 June 2023.

Hendrick was again re-elected at the 2024 general election with a decreased vote share of 35% and a decreased majority of 5,291.

=== Publications ===
- "Question Time Conundrum", Tribune 13 February 2014
- The Ukrainian Crisis: Russia’s relationship with former Soviet States Post EU/NATO Enlargement
- "A View to Brazil", The House Magazine 7 May 2014
- "The Impact of Foreign Players on the Premier League and on England's National Team" Huffington Post 12 June 2014
- "The Government Reforms and Future Election of Aung San Suu Kyi to the Presidency Are Only the Beginning on Burma's Long Road to Being an Inclusive, Democratic Society", Huffington Post 1 July 2014

Parliament of the United Kingdom
Preceded by Audrey Wise	Member of Parliament for Preston; 2000–present	Incumbent
