= 1915 Preston by-election =

UK Parliamentary by-election

The 1915 Preston by-election was held on 9 June 1915. The by-election was held due to the incumbent Conservative MP, Alfred Aspinall Tobin, becoming a county court judge. It was won by the Conservative candidate Urban H. Broughton who was unopposed due to a War-time electoral pact.
