= 2nd Royal Lancashire Militia (The Duke of Lancaster's Own Rifles) =

Auxiliary unit of the British Army

2nd Royal Lancashire Militia (The Duke of Lancaster's Own Rifles) 3rd & 4th Bns King's (Liverpool Regiment)
- Active: 1 March 1797–April 1953
- Country: United Kingdom
- Branch: Militia
- Role: Infantry
- Size: 1-2 Battalions
- Part of: 33rd Division
- Garrison/HQ: Peninsula Barracks, Warrington; Seaforth Barracks, Liverpool
- Engagements: Second Boer War; Battle of Neuve Chapelle; Second Battle of Ypres; Battle of Aubers Ridge; Attacks on High Wood; Battle of Arras; Battle of Polygon Wood; Battle of the Lys; Battle of Épehy; Battle of the Canal du Nord; Battle of Cambrai; Battle of the Selle; Battle of the Sambre

The 2nd Royal Lancashire Militia (The Duke of Lancaster's Own Rifles) was an auxiliary (Note: It is incorrect to describe the British Militia as 'irregular': throughout their history they were equipped and trained exactly like the line regiments of the regular army, and once embodied in time of war they were fulltime professional soldiers for the duration of their enlistment.) regiment raised in the county of Lancashire in North West England during the French Revolutionary War. It later became part of the King's (Liverpool Regiment). Although primarily intended for home defence, its battalions served in Ireland and saw active service during the Second Boer War. After conversion to the Special Reserve (SR) under the Haldane Reforms one of its battalions was among just a handful of SR units to see combat during World War I, fighting in many actions on the Western Front from early 1915 until the Armistice in 1918. After a shadowy postwar existence the unit was finally disbanded in 1953.

== Background ==
The universal obligation to military service in the Shire levy was long established in England and its legal basis was updated by two acts of 1557 (4 & 5 Ph. & M. cc. 2 and 3), which placed selected men, the 'trained bands', under the command of Lords Lieutenant appointed by the monarch. This is seen as the starting date for the organised county militia in England. It was an important element in the country's defence at the time of the Armada in the 1580s, and control of the militia was one of the areas of dispute between King Charles I and Parliament that led to the English Civil War. The English Militia was re-established under local control in 1662 after the Restoration of the monarchy, and the Lancashire Militia fought in King William III's campaign in Ireland in 1690–91, and against the Jacobite Risings in 1715 and 1745. However, between periods of national emergency the militia was regularly allowed to decline.

Under threat of French invasion during the Seven Years' War a series of Militia Acts from 1757 reorganised the county militia regiments, the men being conscripted by means of parish ballots (paid substitutes were permitted) to serve for three years. In 1760 Lancashire's quota was set at 800 men in one regiment, which received the title Royal Lancashire Militia in 1761. These reformed regiments were 'embodied' for permanent service in home defence until the end of the Seven Years' War and again during the War of American Independence. In peacetime they assembled for 28 days' annual training. The militia were re-embodied shortly before Revolutionary France declared war on Britain on 1 February 1793.

== 2nd Royal Lancashire Militia ==
=== French Wars ===
Lancashire's militia quota set in 1760 was small in proportion to its population, which soared during the Industrial Revolution. By 1796 it represented only one man in every 43 of those eligible. But in that year an additional ballot was carried out to raise men for the 'Supplementary Militia' to reinforce the standing militia regiments and to form additional temporary regiments. Lancashire's quota was increased to five regiments, and recruitment became difficult. Nevertheless, the 1st Royal Lancashire Supplementary Militia was raised on 1 March 1797 at Liverpool under the personal command of the 12th Earl of Derby as lord lieutenant. It was formally embodied for service on 10 March 1798, increased to 12 companies in June and on 17 August that year it was placed on a permanent footing as the 2nd Royal Lancashire Militia (2nd RLM). However, it was reduced to 10 companies again in November.

During the French Wars the militia were employed anywhere in the country for coast defence, manning garrisons, guarding prisoners of war, and for internal security, while the Regular Army regarded them as a source of trained men if they could be persuaded to transfer. Their traditional local defence duties were taken over by the part-time Volunteers. A peace treaty having been agreed (the Treaty of Amiens), the Militia could be stood down, the 2nd RLM being disembodied on 29 April 1802. However, the Peace of Amiens did not last long, and the Militia were soon called out again, the 2nd RLM being embodied from 14 March 1803. In June it was enlarged to 12 companies once more, and in January 1804 permission was given to convert two of the companies to rifle companies, though in July 1805 it was reduced to 10 companies again. During the summer of 1805, when Napoleon was massing his 'Army of England' at Boulogne for a projected invasion, the regiment was part of an infantry brigade under Maj-Gen Sir Baldwin Leighton, 6th Baronet defending County Durham. On 1 September 1805, the regiment had 924 men under the command of Lt-Col Edward Wilson, with eight companies at Sunderland Barracks and two at Fretwell Barracks.

After routine service in mainland Britain during the Napoleonic Wars – it was successively stationed at Chelmsford, Sunderland, Liverpool, Hull and Tiverton, Devon – the 2nd RLM volunteered for service in Ireland in 1814. Although most of the militia was disembodied after the Treaty of Fontainebleau in April 1814, the 2nd RLM was still in Ireland when Napoleon escaped from Elba and returned to power in France in 1815. The three regiments of Lancashire Militia, which happened to be stationed together at Dublin, were allowed to recruit back to full strength by ballot and 'by beat of drum'. They also provided drafts of around 1000 volunteers to the regular regiments being sent to Belgium. There is a story that many of the Guardsmen at the Battle of Waterloo were still wearing their Militia uniforms. The militia continued to do duty after the Battle of Waterloo while much of the Regular Army was with the Army of Occupation, and the 2nd RLM did not return from Ireland to be disembodied until 3 March 1816.

=== Long Peace ===
After Waterloo there was a long period of peace. The Mutiny Act 1817 allowed the annual training of the militia to be dispensed with. So although officers continued to be commissioned into the regiment (the Colonel's grandson, the Hon Edward Geoffrey Stanley (later 14th Earl of Derby) was commissioned as major on 1 October 1820; he resigned in 1827.) and the ballot was regularly held, the selected men were rarely mustered for drill. The ballot was suspended by the Militia Act 1829, and the permanent staffs of sergeants and drummers (who were occasionally used to maintain public order) were progressively reduced.

In 1831 King William IV bestowed on the three Lancashire Militia Regiments the additional title of The Duke of Lancaster's Own. (Note: The monarch (of either sex) also being Duke of Lancaster.)

The 13th Earl of Derby was appointed colonel of the regiment after he succeeded his father in the earldom in 1834. In 1846–47 there was an effort to replace elderly members of the permanent staff and to appoint a few younger officers from the county gentry, though they had no duties to perform. The Earl of Derby resigned the command of the 2nd RLM and his younger son the Hon Henry Thomas Stanley was appointed on 8 May 1847, but he also resigned the following year and his youngest brother the Hon Charles James Fox Stanley was appointed on 25 February 1848.

=== 1852 Reforms ===
The national Militia of the United Kingdom was reformed by the Militia Act 1852, enacted during a period of international tension. As before, units were raised and administered on a county basis, and filled by voluntary enlistment (although conscription by means of the Militia Ballot might be used if the counties failed to meet their quotas). Training was for 56 days on enlistment, then for 21–28 days per year, during which the men received full army pay, and the permanent staff was increased. Under the Act, Militia units could be embodied by Royal Proclamation for full-time home defence service in three circumstances:

1. 'Whenever a state of war exists between Her Majesty and any foreign power'.
2. 'In all cases of invasion or upon imminent danger thereof'.
3. 'In all cases of rebellion or insurrection'.

Under the new organisation, militia regiments still had an honorary colonel, but were actually commanded by a lieutenant-colonel. Colonel Charles Fox Stanley resigned (in 1855 he was appointed colonel of the newly raised 7th Royal Lancashire Militia (Rifles)) and on 1 March 1852 Sir Thomas Fermor-Hesketh, 5th Baronet, was commissioned as Lt-Col Commandant. The headquarters (HQ) of the 2nd Royal Lancashire was at Liverpool.

=== Crimean War ===
War having broken out with Russia in 1854 and an expeditionary force sent to the Crimea, the Militia were called out for home defence and service in overseas garrisons. The 2nd Royal Lancashire Militia was embodied on 18 December 1854 and raised a second battalion at Warrington (Note: At that time Warrington was in the county of Lancashire; in 1972 it was transferred to Cheshire.) The 2nd RLM was redesignated as a Rifle regiment on 30 January 1855, becoming the 2nd Royal Lancashire Militia (Duke of Lancaster's Own Rifles). The Militia Reserve introduced in 1867 consisted of present and former militiamen who undertook to serve overseas in case of war.

=== Cardwell reforms ===
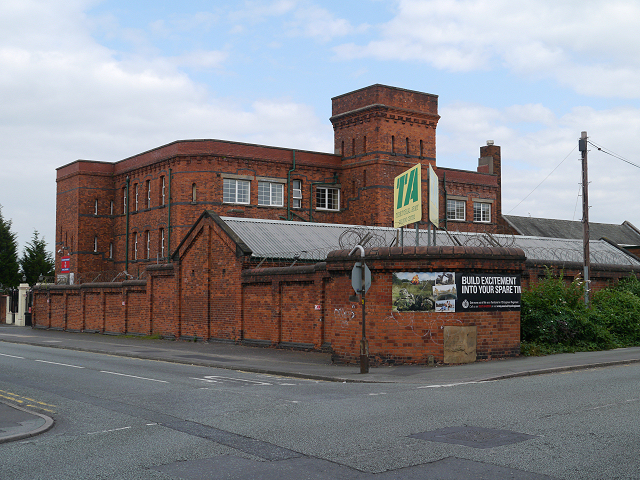
Ordford Barracks (later Peninsula Barracks, Warrington.

Under the 'Localisation of the Forces' scheme introduced by the Cardwell Reforms of 1872, Militia regiments were brigaded with their local Regular and Volunteer Force units. For the two battalions of the 2nd RLM this was Sub-District No 13 (County of Lancaster) in Northern District alongside the 8th (The King's) Regiment of Foot, and a number of Lancashire Rifle Volunteer Corps. Both battalions of the 2nd RLM, together with the brigade depot, were now based at Orford Barracks in Warrington. The Militia were now controlled by the War Office rather than their county Lord Lieutenant, and officers' commissions were signed by the Queen.

Although often referred to as brigades, the sub-districts were purely administrative organisations, but in a continuation of the Cardwell Reforms a mobilisation scheme began to appear in the Army List from December 1875. This assigned Regular and Militia units to places in an order of battle of corps, divisions and brigades for the 'Active Army', even though these formations were entirely theoretical, with no staff or services assigned. The 2nd RLM was assigned to 1st Brigade of 2nd Division, VI Corps, alongside two Irish militia regiments. The division would have mustered at Liverpool in time of war.

== The King's (Liverpool Regiment) ==
The Childers Reforms of 1881 took Cardwell's reforms further, with the militia formally joining their linked county regiments. The 8th Foot became The King's (Liverpool Regiment) and the 2nd RLM became its 3rd and 4th Battalions on 1 July 1881 (continuing to be administered as a double-battalion regiment until 1 August 1900). Militia battalions now had a large cadre of permanent staff (about 30). Around a third of the recruits and many young officers went on to join the Regular Army.

=== Second Boer War ===
After the disasters of Black Week at the start of the Second Boer War in December 1899, most of the Regular Army was sent to South Africa, and many militia units were embodied to replace them for home defence and to garrison certain overseas stations. At the same time, some of the regiments recruited from large urban areas such as Liverpool added two new Regular battalions, so the 3rd and 4th (Militia) battalions of the King's (Liverpool) Regiment were renumbered 5th and 6th. The '5th' Battalion was embodied from 23 January to 16 October 1900, the '6th' from 3 May to 1 November 1900. The additional Regular battalions were disbanded in 1901, and the 5th and 6th Bns resumed their original numbers on 28 September.

Both battalions then volunteered for service in South Africa and were embodied for a second period. The 3rd Bn was embodied on 2 December 1901 and embarked on 16 December, with a strength of 26 officers and 561 other ranks (ORs) under the command of Lt-Col J. Mount Batten. On arrival at Durban it sent detachments to Durban Road, Phillipstown, Hopetown and Steynsburg, and took over part of the line of blockhouses near the Modder River and in Cape Colony, where they were involved in several night alarms. On 21 March 1902 the battalion furnished the escort for a supply convoy from De Aar to Prieska, a march of 150 miles (240 km), which safely reached its destination despite frequent harassment by parties of Boers.

The 4th Bn was embodied on 6 January 1902 and embarked with 23 officers and 677 ORs under the command of Lt-Col W.H. Hand, arriving at Port Elizabeth on 15 February. It proceeded to Mafeking and was employed until 6 July on blockhouse duty, the Mafeking defences and at Lichtenburg, Palfontein, Maritzana and Maribogo, with detachments at Labatzi and Vryburg. After the blockhouse line was vacated the battalion concentrated at Vryburg and then marched to Tygerskloof where it entrained for Cape Town on 24 August. The 4th Bn had suffered one officer and five ORs killed or died on service.

Both battalions left South Africa for home on 27 August and were disembodied on 15 September 1902. The men of both battalions received the Queen's South Africa Medal with the clasps for 'Cape Colony' and 'South Africa 1902' and Lt-Col Mount Batten was awarded a Companionship of the Order of the Bath (CB). The battalions were granted the Battle Honour South Africa 1902.

== Special Reserve ==
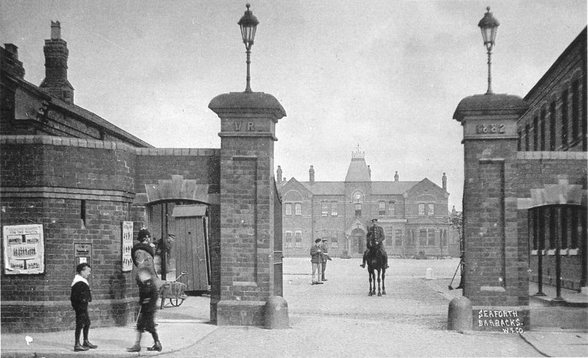
Seaforth Barracks.

After the Boer War, the future of the Militia was called into question. There were moves to reform the Auxiliary Forces (Militia, Yeomanry and Volunteers) to take their place in the six Army Corps proposed by St John Brodrick as Secretary of State for War. However, little of Brodrick's scheme was carried out. Under the more sweeping Haldane Reforms of 1908, the militia was replaced by the Special Reserve, a semi-professional force whose role was to provide reinforcement drafts for regular units serving overseas in wartime (similar to the Militia Reserve of 1867). From 2 August 1908 the two former 2nd RLM battalions became the 3rd (Reserve) Bn and 4th (Extra Reserve) Bn of the King's (Liverpool Regiment). Both battalions were based at the King's regimental depot at Seaforth Barracks, Liverpool, from 1910.

== World War I ==
=== 3rd (Reserve) Battalion ===
On the outbreak of war the battalion was embodied at Seaforth on 4 August 1914 under Lt-Col H.H. Hobson, commanding officer (CO) since 30 October 1910, and went to its war station at Hightown. In 1915 it moved to Pembroke Dock and then at the end of 1917 it went to Ireland, being stationed at Cork, where it remained until the end of the war. Throughout, its role was to train and despatch drafts of reservists, special reservists, recruits and returning wounded for the regular battalions of the King's, especially the 1st Bn serving with the British Expeditionary Force (BEF) on the Western Front. In November the 3rd Bn formed 15th (Reserve) Bn (see below) to carry out a similar role for the 'Kitchener's Army' battalions of the regiment.

On 10 November 1915 3rd Bn was ordered to send a draft of 109 men to the new Machine Gun Training Centre at Grantham where they were to form the basis of a machine-gun company of the new Machine Gun Corps for one of the brigades serving overseas. In addition, 10 men at a time were to undergo training at Grantham as battalion machine gunners. The order stated that 'Great care should be taken in the selection of men for training as machine gunners as only well educated and intelligent men are suitable for this work'.

3rd (Reserve) Bn was disembodied on 4 September 1919 (the remaining personnel having been transferred to the 1st Bn on 16 July).

=== 4th (Extra Reserve) Battalion ===
The 4th Bn was also embodied at Seaforth on 4 August 1914 under Lt-Col J.W. Allen, CO since 15 July 1913, and went to Edinburgh. Like the 3rd Bn, it formed a reserve battalion (16th Reserve Bn, see below) for the Kitchener battalions of the regiment. The 4th Bn was one of the few SR units (mainly 'Extra Reserve' battalions) actually to see overseas service in WWI, possibly because the 2nd Bn spent the whole war in India and did not require many reinforcements.

==== 3rd (Lahore) Division ====
The battalion arrived at Le Havre on 6 March 1915 and was assigned to the Indian Corps in the Béthune sector of the Western Front. It joined 9th (Sirhind) Brigade of the 3rd (Lahore) Division at Robecq on 9 March and had a peripheral part in the Battle of Neuve Chapelle that began next day. This battle, the first serious attack by the BEF since Trench warfare had set in, was the preliminary for a planned offensive against the dominating height of Aubers Ridge. The Sirhind Bde was in corps reserve for the first two days, then on 12 March it led the Indian Corps' renewed assault, its leading battalions struggling forward against enfilade fire before getting held up. Further attacks that day were cancelled, and the offensive was halted next day.

The Lahore Division was in rest camps near Merville when the Germans launched their gas attack at the Second Battle of Ypres on 23 April. It was rushed northwards to reinforce the troops in the Ypres Salient and committed to a counter-attack alongside French troops on 26 April. It marched off at 05.30 and was in position by 12.30, with the Sirhind Bde in reserve. The leading brigades were badly mauled by artillery fire as they crossed Hill Top ridge, and as they reached the enemy barbed wire the Germans released a gas cloud. The Sirhind Bde was sent up to retrieve the situation, and at the end of they day held the British starting line. Once again, the part played by 4th King's had been peripheral. However, next day (27 April) the Sirhind Bde attacked again, with 4th King's under Lt-Col Allen supporting two Gurkha battalions. As before, they ran into a hail of artillery fire as they crossed Hill Top ridge, and even with the supports coming up only part of the attacking line reached Canadian Farm and the bottom of the valley. A second attempt that evening also failed, and by nightfall the Sirhind Bde, its flanks 'in the air' had been withdrawn to the British line once more. 4th King's had suffered by far the highest casualties in the division, losing 9 officers and 373 ORs. Further attacks by the brigade on 28 and 30 April and on 1 May were all cancelled when the neighbouring French units failed to advance. On the evening of 1 May the Lahore Division was withdrawn as the BEF pulled back to a stronger defence line round the town of Ypres.

The Lahore Division returned to the Indian Corps in the Béthune sector for a renewal of the British offensive (the Battle of Aubers Ridge) on 9 May, but the much-weakened division was relegated to holding the line on one flank and suffered few casualties. For the next attack (the Battle of Festubert) the Sirhind Bde was loaned to the 7th (Meerut) Division. It supported the attack by the Garhwal Bde on the night of 15/16 May, but surprise was lost and the leading battalions made no progress. The Sirhind Bde was therefore switched to support the more successful attack of the 2nd Division, forming a defensive flank for its attack on 17 May and then taking over some of its trenches next day. It supported another attack by 2nd Division the following afternoon, but both the British front line and the ground behind were so heavily shelled that despite some 'desperate efforts' by 4th King's to get a few men forward the attack was abortive. The offensive was closed down on 25 May and the Indian Corps was given a defensive role. The Indian Corps was suffering badly from the lack of reinforcements for its Indian battalions, and apart from subsidiary actions in support of the Loos Offensive played only a minor role over coming months. It was ordered to the Mesopotamian Front on 31 October, and 4th Kings left the Lahore Division on 10 November 1915.

==== 33rd Division ====
33rd Division's formation sign.

At first the battalion was attached to 137th (Staffordshire) Brigade in 46th (North Midland) Division, a Territorial Force (TF) formation. On 3 December it transferred to 19th (Western) Division, a New Army ('Kitchener's Army') formation, being attached in succession to 56th Bde (composed of Lancashire battalions) and then 58th Bde. Finally, on 28 February 1916, the battalion joined 98th Bde in 33rd Division, with which it remained for the rest of the war. 33rd Division was a New Army formation originally composed of 'Pals battalions', with 98th Bde consisting of four Public Schools Battalions. However, these had been stripped for officer candidates and the brigade reconstructed with two Regular, one TF and one SR (4th King's) battalions.

==== Somme ====
At the beginning of July 33 Division moved south to take part in the Somme Offensive. After detraining near Amiens the division marched up through Fricourt and Montauban. It was assigned a role in the Battle of Bazentin Ridge on 15 July, when 100th Bde attacked into High Wood and 98th Bde with a machine gun company was concentrated on the edge of Bazentin le Petit. The attack was a costly failure, and 98th Bde was drawn into the bitter fighting that continued until 20 July.

After a period of rest, 33rd Division resumed the attacks on High Wood on 18 August. The divisional historian described 4th King's advances towards 'Wood Lane' as 'clever and determined', but although they 'walked right into the barrage' they lost heavily and did not reach Wood Lane.

The fighting continued on the Somme into the Autumn. On 28 October 33rd Division captured 'Rainy' and 'Dewdrop' Trenches. 4th King's (now commanded by Lt-Col E.M. Beall) and 1st Middlesex Regiment cleared Dewdrop from either end, 'bombing' the garrison out with Hand grenades, 4th King's taking 148 prisoners, including a battalion commander. Further attempts to gain ground were foiled by deep mud, and the troops began to suffer badly from Trench foot. The division endured the winter in the Somme sector, Trench raiding being carried out once frost had hardened the mud. In March 1917 it was withdrawn to train for the forthcoming Arras Offensive

==== Arras ====
By the time 33rd Division reached its concentration area the offensive had started well, but enemy resistance was hardening. 98th Brigade was engaged in a large attack (the Second Battle of the Scarpe) on 23 April. A lodgement had been made in the Hindenburg Line and the brigade was ordered to force its way southwards along the trench system, mainly with grenades, and meet up with 100th Bde attacking in the Sensée Valley. The attack went in before dawn and at first all went well, but the lifting morning mist showed that the Sensée Valley was completely dominated by enemy machine gun positions and both brigades were driven back almost to their starting positions. 98th Brigade made a new attack at 19.00 to capture the high ground above the Sensée, led by the fresh 4th King's. The leading bombing party was personally led by Lt-Col Beall in his shirtsleeves. The attack secured positions in the Hindenburg Support Line, which the brigade held against counter-attacks that night. Next morning they found that the enemy had retreated.

After a period of rest the division went back into the line and on 20 May was ordered to carry out an almost identical operation: 98th Bde bombing its way along the trench line to meet 100th Bde. The attack went in when the Germans were at breakfast. The block in the trench was blown by a mine and the bombers reached their objective in the first line, but were held up in the support line. In a renewed attack in the evening, 98th Bde made better progress along the support line. 98th Brigade went in again a week later to continue the work, again attacking at an unusual time (just after the Germans' lunch) and 4th King's bombed their way down across the Sensée to meet the 19th Bde. All the battalions had suffered heavy casualties during these operations, especially among junior officers.

==== Flanders ====
The BEF's next offensive would be in Flanders, with the main attack at Ypres while forces were gathered on the coast at Nieuport to take advantage of the expected breakthrough. 33rd Division was sent to Nieuport on 31 July, and spent a month there, troubled by aerial bombing at night, shelling with Mustard gas, and regular trench raiding by both sides. By the end of August it was plain that the breakthrough and coastal operation was not going to come off, so the division was switched to Ypres where the offensive (the Third Battle of Ypres) was continuing.

After a period of training, the division took over the unconsolidated front line at 'Carlisle Farm' on the Menin Road on the night of 24/25 September for the Battle of Polygon Wood due on 26 September. After the relief was complete the Germans laid down a heavy barrage down on the line at 05.30 on 25 September and attacked out of the morning mist, followed by a second attack an hour later. Most of 98th Brigade's frontline positions were driven in and their occupants pushed back to the support line. 4th King's behind had to throw out a flank to keep contact with the neighbouring brigade. A counter-attack in the afternoon was caught by machine gun fire, but the brigade managed to establish a continuous line. This German spoiling attack severely dislocated 33rd Division's planned attack for 26 September. Although 4th King's and the rest of 98th Brigade passed through, its attack was limited to recovering lost ground. Private O'Conor of 4th King's distinguished himself taking by command of a group in the confused advance.

==== Winter 1917–18 ====
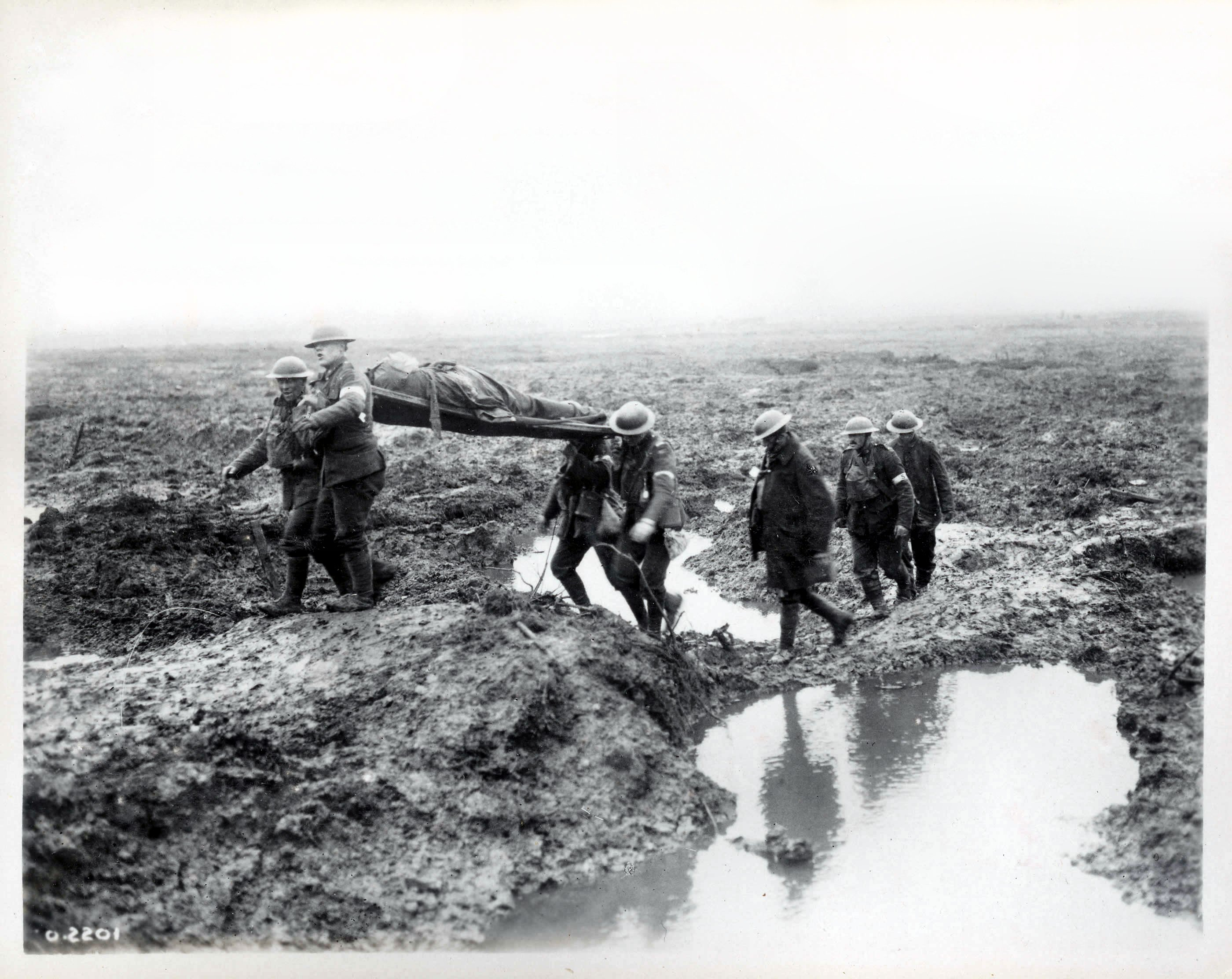
Conditions at Passchendaele.

In November 1917 the 33rd Division was moved to the north of Ypres to take over the Passchendaele Salient from the Canadians, and spent the winter months taking turns of duty in this, probably the worst area on the Western Front, a sea of mud with no cover, with appalling trackways to traverse to and from the line, and under persistent shellfire, particularly with mustard gas shells.

==== Spring Offensive ====
The Germans launched their Spring Offensive on 21 March, but First Army in the northern part of the Ypres Salient was unaffected. However, on 9 April the Germans launched a new phase of their offensive, the Battle of the Lys, and during the night of 10/11 April the infantry of 33rd Division were sent south by train as reinforcements, organised by brigade groups. German guns scored a direct hit on the train carrying 4th King's, killing 40 men. Early on 12 April 98th Bde moved to Dranouter as reserve for 19th (Western) Division, and was then ordered to occupy the 'Green Line' (rear defences) to be ready to counter-attack. But the situation around Méteren was critical, with the line held only by machine gunners, signallers and cooks, and the brigade was marched across to rejoin the headquarters of 33rd Division. Finally, it was marched south to defend Bailleul, without getting into serious action. The Germans failed to exploit their success next day. On 14 April 4th King's supported 19th Bde, which was holding off repeated attacks, but by the end of the day the line seemed to have been stabilised. 98th Brigade relieved the battered 19th Bde on 15 April.

However, on 16 April the Germans launched an attack out of the morning fog, annihilated a company of 4th King's and captured Méteren from the 2nd New Zealand Entrenching Battalion. By the time 98th Bde's reserve battalion arrived the Germans were streaming through the gap between the New Zealanders and 4th King's, held up only by flanking fire from 19th Bde and dismounted men from 5th Battalion, Tank Corps, manning Lewis guns. Nevertheless, the divisional pioneer battalion (18th Middlesex) and the 11th Field Company Royal Engineers made a spirited counter-attack with the bayonet to support 4th King's, and shored up the line behind the village.

On 17 April the brigade's front was reinforced by French Chasseurs à pied as well as the Tank Corps' machine-gunners. A heavy bombardment came down at 09.00, but every German attempt to advance was halted by fire. At 18.00 the enemy attacked again along the whole of the 98th Bde's position, working their way up through some houses and capturing a farm held by the Chasseurs . However, they were thrown out by a counter-attack including part of 4th King's and 1st Middlesex. When 4th King's was relieved on 19 April it had been reduced to a 'mere skeleton'. By now the German offensive had lost impetus, and fresh Allied formations were arriving. 33rd Division was relieved and went to a back area at Cassel, west of Ypres. The French Prime Minister, Georges Clemenceau, was visiting at the time, and asked to see a British brigade that had just come out of the fight. He was shown 98th Bde, which was only about 1000 strong. On seeing how weak it was, he exclaimed, 'Mon Dieu, c'est tout!'.

When the division had rested and absorbed reinforcements, it went back into the line in the area of RidgeWood, about 3 miles (4.8 km) SSW of Ypres, where there was almost constant low-intensity fighting associated with the French at nearby Mont Kemmel. Ridge Wood itself changed hands several times; it was finally captured on 14 July.

==== Hundred Days Offensive ====
The Allies launched their Hundred Days Offensive at the Battle of Amiens on 8 August. 33rd Division was not involved until it was brought into reserve for the Battle of Épehy on 18 September. On 21 September 19th and 98th Bdes cooperated in an attack by 58th (2/1st London) Division to close up to the Hindenburg Line near Villers-Guislain. 4th King's gained a little ground by bombing their way down trenches from the north, but finding no sign of 19th Bde they withdrew again; fighting continued in these trenches for several days.

For the Battle of the Canal du Nord on 29 September, 33rd Division was supposed to be occupying Villers-Guislain and ground vacated by the Germans under pressure from the flanks. 98th Brigade advanced in line before dawn, with 4th King's maintaining contact with the neighbouring divisions, but as the troops followed their Creeping barrage they were checked by Germans filtering back into Villers-Guislain. The divisional history praises the 'outstanding gallantry' of 4th King's, who despite taking the heaviest losses 'moved forward step by step from one group of shell holes to another, maintaining a perfect line of advance'. Next day it was discovered that the Germans had abandoned Villers-Guislain and by 1 October the brigade had reached the crossings of the St Quentin Canal. 33rd Division crossed on 4 October without any heavy fighting, and occupied the Hindenburg Support line before going into reserve.

The division was back in the line for the Battle of Cambrai on 9 October. There were few formal defences and the advance was essentially a pursuit. 33rd Division advanced by brigade groups, accompanied by artillery but with no barrage unless called for. It advanced 7.5 miles (12.1 km) in the day, patrols reaching the River Selle, which they found to be held in strength. 98th Brigade took over the lead on 10 October, with 4th King's on the left reaching the Le Cateau–Neuvilly railway. By the end of the day the brigade closed up to the river, 4th King's and 2nd Argyll and Sutherland Highlanders getting some outposts across during the night. The Argylls held their outpost next day, but 4th King's were driven out by British shells falling short. The Royal Engineers bridged the river and the division crossed in force on 13 October before being relieved to prepare for the next setpiece attack (the Battle of the Selle).

The battle to take the high ground beyond the Selle began on 20 October, 33rd Division joining in on 23 October. 98th Brigade advanced behind a creeping barrage that started at 02.00, reached its first objective, the village of Forest, by 03.30, taking hundreds of prisoners. When the barrage moved on again at 03.52, 4th King's took the lead and continued to the second objective by 07.00. However, it ran into strong opposition before the third objective; two companies of 1st Middlesex were sent up to turn the enemy's flank, but 4th King's had reached the objective on the far side of the Harpies stream. 2nd Argylls then took up the advance. By nightfall the brigade was only just short of its objective. At 04.00 the brigade launched an attack that took a strongly-wired trench. By now, however, the battalions had suffered significant casualties and were very tired, so 100th Bde passed through to continue the advance. On 26 October 4th King's enveloped Englefontaine, liberating large numbers of French civilians sheltering in the cellars.

The last setpiece battle for the BEF was the Battle of the Sambre on 4 November, after which it pursued the beaten German forces. 33rd Division took the lead on its front on the morning of 5 November until it reached the River Sambre itself. 98th Brigade then occupied a line between the river and the Forêt de Mormal until after dark, when the engineers built bridges. On 6 and 7 November the brigade pushed on again against weak opposition: the guns were across the river by now and their barrages were sufficient to clear rearguards from the villages and woods. 33rd Division was relieved that night. The Armistice with Germany was signed before it went back into the line.

The brigade was at Sassegnies near Aulnoye when the Armistice came into force on 11 November, and went into billets around Caullery. Between 6 and 17 December it marched back to the Amiens area. Demobilisation proceeded rapidly in 1919. 4th King's was formally disembodied on 31 December 1919.

=== 15th (Reserve) Battalion ===
After Lord Kitchener issued his call for volunteers in August 1914, the battalions of the 1st, 2nd and 3rd New Armies ('K1', 'K2' and 'K3' of 'Kitchener's Army') were quickly formed at the regimental depots. The SR battalions also swelled with new recruits and were soon well above their establishment strength. On 8 October 1914 each SR battalion was ordered to use the surplus to form a service battalion of the 4th New Army ('K4'). Accordingly, the 3rd (Reserve) Bn formed the 15th (Service) Battalion of the King's Regiment at Freshfield, Formby, on 26 October 1914. It trained for active service as part of 105th Brigade in 35th Division. On 10 April 1915 the War Office decided to convert the K4 battalions into 2nd Reserve units, to provide drafts for the K1–K3 battalions in the same way that the SR was doing for the Regular battalions. The battalion became 15th (Reserve) Battalion, King's, in 11th Reserve Brigade. The battalion moved to Kinmel Camp in July and then to Prees Heath Camp in August 1915. On 1 September 1916 the 2nd Reserve battalions were transferred to the Training Reserve (TR) and the battalion was redesignated 49th Training Reserve Bn, still in 11th Reserve Bde at Prees Heath. The training staff retained their King's badges. On 1 December 1917 it became 49th Recruit Distribution Bn (dropping the 'Recruit' on 25 June 1918). It was disbanded at Prees Heath on 3 May 1919.

=== 16th (Reserve) Battalion ===
16th (Service) Bn was formed by 4th (Extra Reserve) Bn at Seaforth on 26 October 1914 and sent to Hoylake. (The War Office cancelled the order for most Extra Reserve battalions on 25 October, but 4th (ER) Bn King's went ahead and formed 16th (S) Bn.) Like the 15th Bn, it was part of 105th Bde in 35th Division, then became 16th (Reserve) Battalion, King's, in 11th Reserve Bde on 1 April 1915. It served at Kinmel and Prees Heath. On 1 September 1916 it was disbanded and its personnel distributed among the other battalions of 11th Reserve Bde.

== Postwar ==
The SR resumed its old title of Militia in 1921 and then became the Supplementary Reserve in 1924, but like most militia battalions the 3rd and 4th King's Liverpools remained in abeyance after World War I. Through the 1920s they continued to appear in the Army List, but by the outbreak of World War II in 1939 there were no officers listed. (Note: However, the King's Regiment (Liverpool) did have a number of Supplementary Reserve officers Class B attached to it.) The Militia was not activated during World War II and was formally disbanded in April 1953

== Commanders ==
The following served as colonel, honorary colonel or lieutenant-colonel commandant of the regiment or its two battalions:

- Edward Smith-Stanley, 12th Earl of Derby, colonel from 1 March 1797
- Edward Smith-Stanley, 13th Earl of Derby, colonel from ca 1834
- Hon Henry Thomas Stanley, colonel from 8 May 1847
- Hon Charles James Fox Stanley, colonel from 25 February 1848
- Sir Thomas Fermor-Hesketh, 5th Baronet, commissioned as Lt-Col Commandant on 1 March 1852 and held the position until 1872.
- Nicholas Blundell promoted Lt-Col Commandant 25 September 1872; appointed hon colonel 27 July 1881
- C.S. Carraway, promoted from Lt-Col, 4th Bn (28 October 1876), to Lt-Col commandant 27 July 1881
- Sir Thomas George Fermor-Hesketh, 7th Baronet, became honorary colonel of the 2nd RLM (and both its battalions) on 12 September 1894, and continued after the 1908 reforms until his death in 1924.
- Charles C. Woodward promoted Lt-Col commandant 19 September 1894

After 1900 the two battalions were administered separately, apart from sharing their hon colonel.

== Heritage and ceremonial ==
=== Precedence ===
In the early days militia regiments serving together drew lots for their relative precedence. From 1778 the counties were given an order of precedence determined by ballot each year, but the militia order of precedence balloted for in 1793 (when Lancashire was 37th) remained in force throughout the French Revolutionary War: this covered all the regiments formed in the county. Another ballot for precedence took place at the start of the Napoleonic War: Lancashire was 52nd. This list continued until 1833. In that year the King drew the lots for individual regiments and the resulting list remained in force with minor amendments until the end of the militia. The regiments raised before the peace of 1783 took the first 67 places, with the 1st RLM at 45th; the next 60 places covered the regiments raised for the French Revolutionary War, including the 2nd RLM at 113th. Formally, the regiment became the 113th, or 2nd Royal Lancashire Militia (The Duke of Lancaster's Own), but the 2nd RLM like most regiments seems to have paid little attention to the additional number.

=== Uniforms and insignia ===
The uniform of the Royal Lancashire Militia was red with the blue facings appropriate to 'Royal' regiments. By 1803 the lace button loops were arranged in pairs (denoting the 2ndd Regiment, as in the Brigade of Guards). By Royal warrant in 1805 militia colonels were reminded that their grenadier company was to wear the bearskin cap (despite the cost).The two rifle companies apparently wore a uniform approximating to that of the 95th Rifles. The badge was the red rose of Lancashire. Around 1810 the regimental buttons bore the number '2' over the letters 'RL' within a crowned star. On becoming Rifles in 1855 the 2nd RLM changed to Rifle green uniforms with scarlet facings. Once it became part of the King's (Liverpool Regiment) it wore that regiment's uniform (red with blue facings) and badge.

== See also ==
- Militia (English)
- Militia (Great Britain)
- Militia (United Kingdom)
- Special Reserve
- Lancashire Militia
- King's Regiment (Liverpool)
