= Charles Grenfell =

Charles Grenfell may refer to:

- Charles Grenfell (1790–1867), MP
- Charles Grenfell (1823–1861), MP, son of the above
