= Tulketh Priory =

Priory in Lancashire, England

Coordinates: 53.765456°N 2.771988°W

Tulketh Priory was a priory in Ashton-on-Ribble, Lancashire, England. The priory was the home of a group of Cistercian monks from Savigny Abbey in Normandy until they moved to Furness Abbey in 1127. Tulketh Hall was later built on the site of the priory.
