= Robert Townley Parker =

British politician (1793–1879)

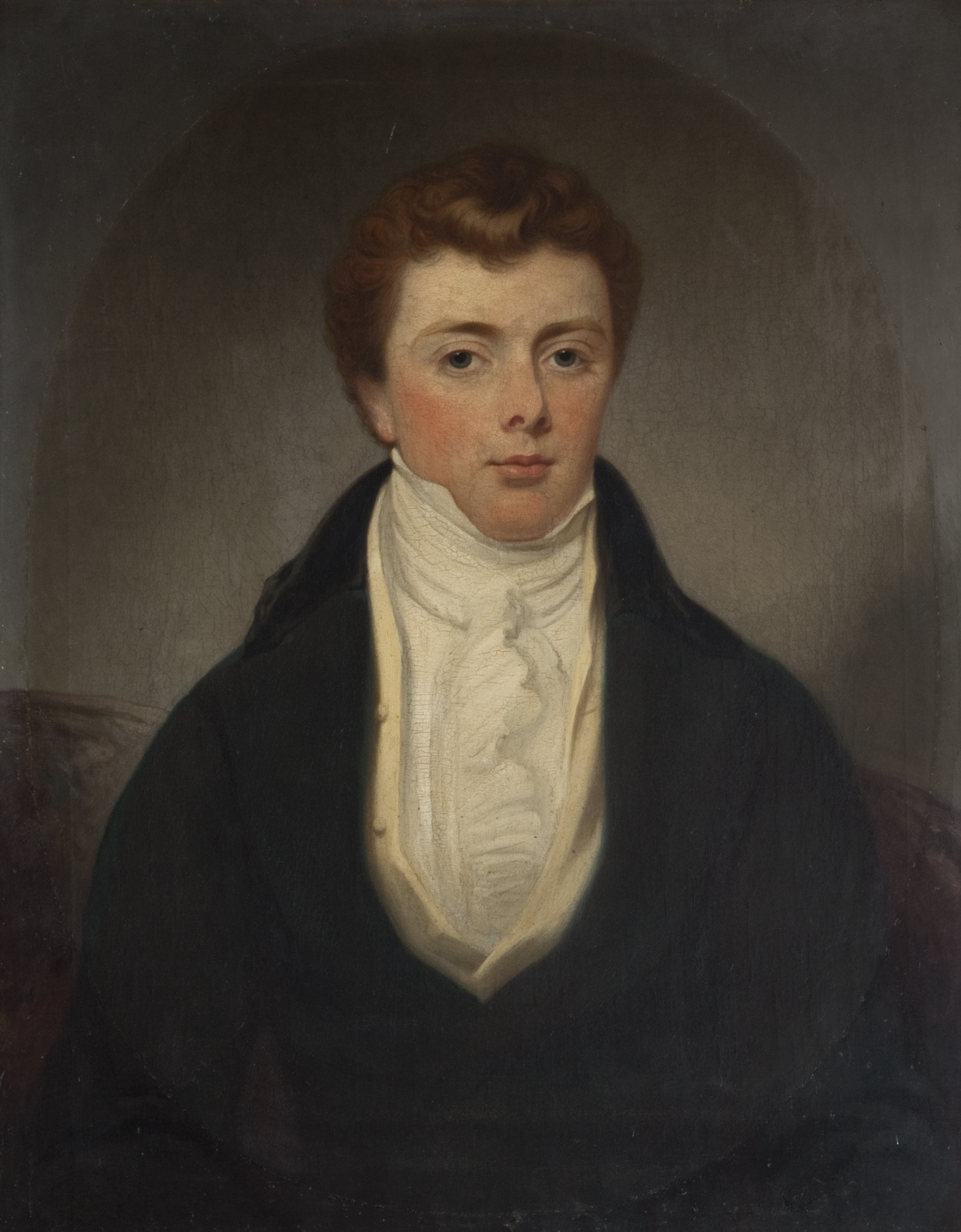
Robert Townley-Parker, portrait by William Lucas

Robert Townley Parker (27 August 1793 – 11 August 1879) was an English landowner and Conservative politician who served as Member of Parliament for Preston from 1837 to 1841 and again from 1852 to 1857. He also served as High Sheriff of Lancashire, a magistrate and Guild Mayor of Preston, and was a prominent Freemason.

== Early life and family ==
Townley Parker was the son of Thomas Townley Parker and Susannah Brooke. His father died in 1794, when Parker was an infant, and he inherited the Cuerden estate, including Cuerden Hall, near Preston, in the historic township of Cuerden in Leylandshire, now within the Borough of Chorley. He was brought up at Astley Hall, Chorley, the home of his mother's family, with his mother and his stepfather, Sir Henry Hoghton.

He was educated at Eton College and Christ Church, Oxford. Between 1812 and 1814 he undertook an extensive Grand Tour with the Cambridge scholar Thomas Smart Hughes, travelling through Spain, Italy, Sicily, Greece and Albania. Hughes subsequently published an account of their journey as Travels in Sicily, Greece and Albania in 1820. During the tour, Townley Parker and his companion were granted an audience with Pope Pius VII.

His paternal family was originally named Parker. The family had longstanding marital connections with cadet branches of the Towneley family over several hundred years. The 1664–65 Visitation of Lancashire records the marriage of John Parker of Extwistle to Margaret, daughter of Lawrence Townley of Barnside. There was also several marriages of Parker daughters to members of the Towneley family during this time. In the eighteenth century Robert Parker of Cuerden married Anne Townley, heiress of the Townleys of Royle, bringing the Royle estates into the Parker family. Townley thereafter became a recurring personal name within the Parker family. Robert's son, Thomas Townley Parker, later formally assumed Townley as part of the family surname.

== Estates and public life ==
Townley Parker served as High Sheriff of Lancashire in 1817 at the age of 24 and subsequently became a magistrate. In 1816 he married Harriet Brooke of Cheshire and began the substantial remodelling of Cuerden Hall. Between 1816 and 1819 the architect Lewis Wyatt enlarged and remodelled the house, creating much of the building that survives today.

The Townley Parker family also held substantial estates in and around Burnley, where earlier generations of the Parker family had been associated with Monk Hall and later Extwistle Hall on Extwistle Moor in Briercliffe. In 1820, when the government and local magistrates were seeking a site for a permanent military barracks in response to civil unrest and economic distress in the area, Townley Parker provided land in Burnley on which Burnley Barracks was built, which was originally part of the Townley's Royle Estate.

== Political career ==
Townley Parker was elected Conservative Member of Parliament for Preston in 1837, serving until 1841. He unsuccessfully contested the constituency again in 1847 before being returned to Parliament in 1852, serving until 1857. A strong supporter of the established Church of England, he opposed measures which he regarded as weakening its position. On 9 March 1841 he presented a petition from Preston opposing further support for Maynooth College and seeking to prevent Roman Catholic Members of Parliament from voting on matters concerning the established Church. He also raised commercial matters in Parliament, including duties imposed on English goods in France and Belgium.

Despite his political defence of the Anglican establishment, Townley Parker maintained close relationships with prominent Catholics and supported several Catholic initiatives in Lancashire. His friends later included Cardinal Manning, Archbishop of Westminster, while the Catholic Bishop of Liverpool was a guest at Cuerden Hall. Townley Parker also supported the provision of Catholic priests for inmates of the Preston House of Correction and patients at the county asylum, with their stipends paid by the county. When he decided not to contest his parliamentary seat again, a delegation of leading local Catholics visited him at Cuerden Hall in an attempt to persuade him to reconsider.

== Guild Mayor of Preston ==
Townley Parker served as Mayor of Preston in 1861–62 and was Guild Mayor for the Preston Guild of 1862. On 2 September 1862 he laid the foundation stone of Preston's new Town Hall, designed by George Gilbert Scott, as part of the Guild celebrations.

His association with the Guild dated back sixty years: as the nine-year-old heir to the Cuerden estate, he had been enrolled as a burgess of Preston during the Guild of 1802.

== Freemasonry ==
A prominent Freemason, he received the unusual distinction of having two separate Masonic lodges named in his honour during his lifetime. Townley Parker Lodge No. 1032 was consecrated at Whittle-le-Woods, near Chorley, in 1864 and was expressly named after him; it now meets at Cunliffe Hall in Chorley.

A second lodge, Townley Parker Lodge No. 1083, was established in Manchester shortly afterwards and consecrated in 1866, with Townley Parker having agreed that the new lodge could bear his name. The two lodges were established in the two divisions of Lancashire Freemasonry. Townley Parker Lodge No. 1032 was associated with the Western Division, in which Townley Parker served as Deputy Provincial Grand Master, whilst Townley Parker Lodge No. 1083 was consecrated in 1866 by Stephen Blair, Provincial Grand Master of the Eastern Division. The Western and Eastern Divisions, created in 1826, later became the Provinces of West Lancashire and East Lancashire respectively. A Royal Arch body, Townley Parker Chapter No. 1083, also bears his name and meets in Manchester in the Province of East Lancashire.

Parliament of the United Kingdom
Preceded by Henry Smith-Stanley; Sir Peter Hesketh-Fleetwood, Bt	Member of Parliament for Preston; 1837–1841; With: Sir Peter Hesketh-Fleetwood, Bt	Succeeded by Sir Peter Hesketh-Fleetwood, Bt; Sir George Strickland, Bt
Preceded by Charles Grenfell; Sir George Strickland, Bt	Member of Parliament for Preston; 1852–1857; With: Sir George Strickland, Bt	Succeeded by Charles Grenfell; R. A. Cross
