= Tulketh Hall =

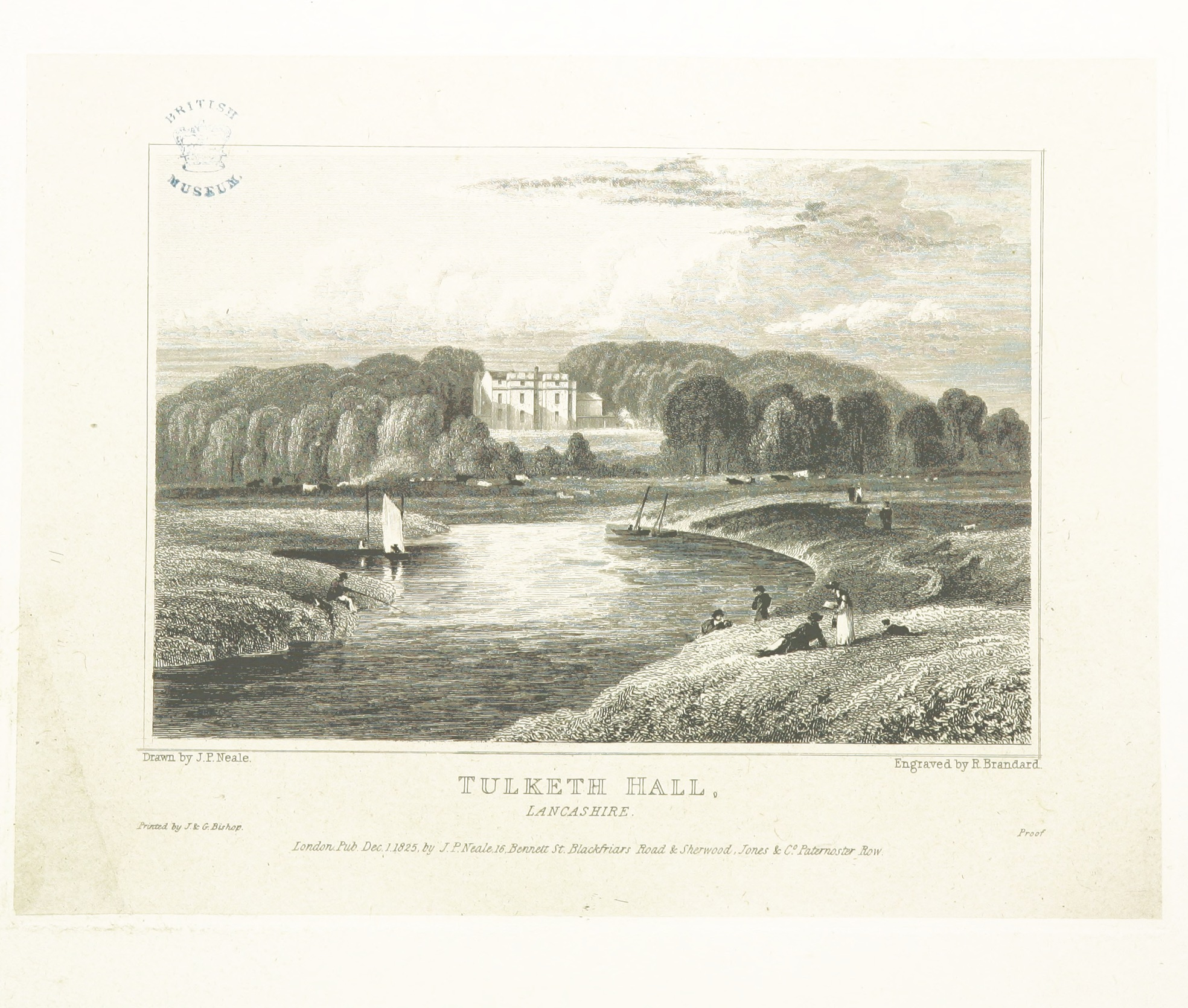
- 1824 drawing by John Preston Neale

- Location within Preston

General information
- Status: Demolished
- Location: Tulketh, Preston, England
- Coordinates: 53.7655°N 2.7255°W
- Opened: 14th century
- Demolished: 1960

Tulketh Hall was a country house in Ashton-on-Ribble, which is now a suburb of Preston, Lancashire, England. It was demolished in 1960.

== History ==
In the 12th century, Tulketh was the location of Tulketh Priory where a group of monks from Savigny Abbey, Normandy, lived until they moved to Furness Abbey in 1127. Documentary evidence of a hall at Tulketh dates from the 14th century, when it was inhabited by Laurence Travers, a Member of Parliament. In the 17th and 18th centuries, Tulketh was the home of at least three families—the Werden family, the Rawstorne family and then the Hesketh family. It was remodelled in the 17th century by Roger Hesketh (d. 1791) in the 18th century. In the 19th century, the exterior was stuccoed, although 18th century interior elements were kept. The building had battlements and a tower, which was also castellated.

By 1844, Tulketh Hall was in the possession of Peter Hesketh-Fleetwood. Along with most of the rest of his property, Hesketh-Fleetwood sold Tulketh in the 1840s to cover his debts. It was bought by a Preston solicitor, and then the Rev. Thomas Johnson; the hall was then used as a vicarage for St Mark's Church. It was remodelled again around this time.

In 1898 the hall was bought by the Catholic Brothers of Charity as a "home for working boys" and a home for "infirm and afflicted boys", but by 1901 had been converted to St Thomas's Home Industrial School for Roman Catholic Boys. After a troubled history in which an unusually high number of the boys and staff died from various serious illnesses the school closed in 1924. Later, it served as the offices for Tulketh Mill. After the Second World War the house was used as an Army Infantry Records Office until the building was damaged by fire in 1952.

Tulketh Hall was demolished in 1960. The site has been developed for housing (Tulketh Crescent and Hesketh St).
