= Sir George Strickland, 7th Baronet =

English Member of Parliament and lawyer

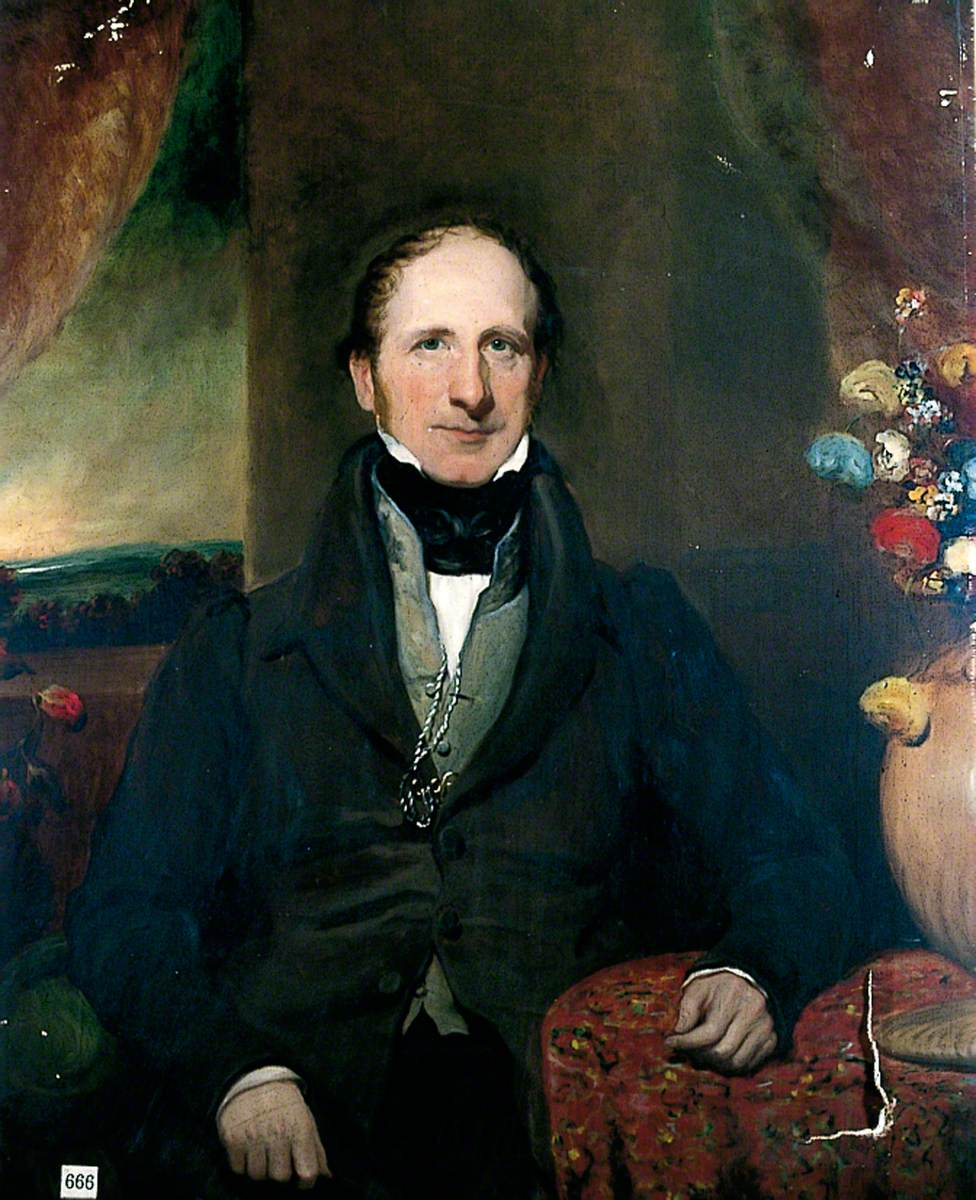
Sir George Strickland, by H. Smith, 1832

Sir George Strickland, 7th Baronet (26 May 1782 – 23 December 1874), also known as Sir George Cholmley, was an English Member of Parliament and lawyer. He took the name Cholmley to succeed to the Cholmley estates in 1865.

== Life ==
Strickland was the second son of Sir William Strickland, 6th Baronet, of Boynton in Yorkshire, but his older brother died before him and he inherited the baronetcy on his father's death in 1834. Strickland inherited Boynton Hall and was Lord of the Manor of Wintringham.

Strickland began his career in the law, being called to the Bar in 1810, and practised as a barrister on the Northern Circuit. However, he took an interest in politics, supporting the Whigs and being an ardent supporter of Parliamentary reform and an early advocate of the secret ballot.

In 1830, at the height of the agitation over the Great Reform Bill, he stood for Parliament in the by-election for Yorkshire that followed Brougham's appointment as Lord Chancellor, but was defeated by another Whig. However, at the general election the following year both men were returned unopposed, and Strickland helped vote the Reform Bill into law. His own Yorkshire constituency was divided under the Reform Act 1832 (2 & 3 Will. 4. c. 45), and he stood and was elected for the West Riding in 1832, which he continued to represent until 1841. In 1840 he attended the World Anti-Slavery Convention in London as a corresponding member of the society.

In 1841, he was instead elected member for Preston, a constituency he served for a further sixteen years. He remained a reforming member throughout his career, also advocating church reform and relief for dissenters.

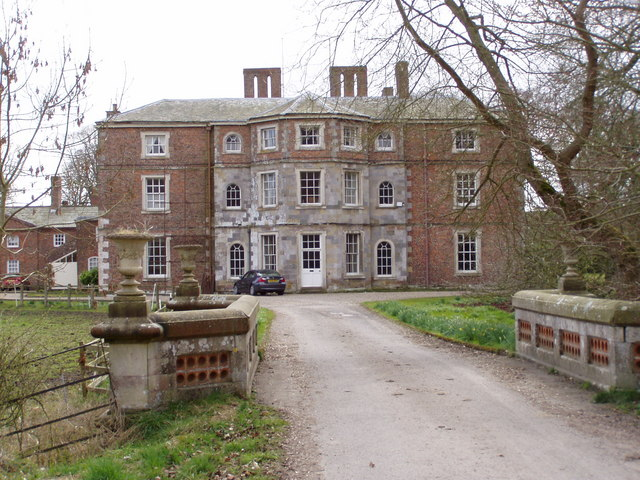
Boynton Hall - seat of the Strickland baronets

Strickland was a well known breeder of racehorses. He lived mainly at Boynton, though his address is recorded as Hildenley in his return as MP for Yorkshire in 1831. In 1844 it seems to have been his opposition that was the principal objection to a projected railway joining Bridlington and York, proposed by George Hudson, which would have passed through Boynton; the railway was never built.

In 1865, he inherited from Nathaniel Cholmley extensive estates at Whitby, Howsham and North Elmsall. In accordance with the terms of Cholmley's will, Strickland adopted by Royal Licence the surname Cholmley and the arms of Cholmley and Wentworth in place of his own and lived the remaining nine years of his life as Sir George Cholmley. On his death in 1874, however, his eldest son and heir Charles reverted to the Strickland surname and arms.

== Marriage and children ==
Strickland married Mary Constable, daughter of the Reverend Charles Constable of Wassand in 1818. They had three sons and at least one daughter.

1. Charles, the eldest son, succeeded to the baronetcy was one of the first winners at Henley Royal Regatta.
2. Frederick, the middle son, was friends with Francis Galton and whose death on 19 October 1849—from hypothermia after falling in a stream and getting lost on his snowy October descent from Mount Washington, New Hampshire—Galton described
3. Lucy Henrietta Strickland (1822–8 July 1871), daughter, married, on 19 December 1844, to James Marriott (died 10 October 1871).
4. Henry, the youngest son, by whom are descended the Strickland-Constables of Wassand who now hold the baronetcy, which they inherited after the direct Strickland line failed in 1938.

He married secondly Jane Leavens (1809-1898) in May 1867 and they had three children: Harry Walter Cholmley (1841-1901), Rosamond Jane Cholmley (1843-1894), and Alfred John Cholmley (1845-1932). The latter, an amateur ornithologist, travelled in 1896 to the Sudan with the explorer Theodore Bent.

== Sources ==
- Memorial inscription, Boynton Church, Yorkshire
- A Gooder (ed.) The Parliamentary Representation of Yorkshire, 1258-1832 (Yorkshire Archaeological Society, Record Series, 1935)
- J Holladay Philbin, Parliamentary Representation 1832 - England and Wales (New Haven: Yale University Press, 1965)
- M Stenton (ed.), Who's Who of British Members of Parliament, Volume I: 1832-1885 (Hassocks: Harvester Press, 1976)
- Victoria County History of the East Riding of Yorkshire

Parliament of the United Kingdom
| Preceded by Viscount Morpeth; Sir John Vanden-Bempde-Johnstone, Bt; William Duncombe; Richard Bethell | Member of Parliament for Yorkshire; 1831–1832; With: Sir John Vanden-Bempde-Johnstone, Bt; John Charles Ramsden; Viscount Morpeth | Constituency abolished |
| New constituency | Member of Parliament for West Riding of Yorkshire; 1832–1841; With: Viscount Morpeth | Succeeded by Hon. John Stuart-Wortley; Edmund Beckett |
| Preceded by Sir Peter Hesketh-Fleetwood, Bt; Robert Townley Parker | Member of Parliament for Preston; 1841–1857; With: Sir Peter Hesketh-Fleetwood, Bt 1841–1847; Charles Grenfell 1847–1852; Robert Townley Parker 1852–1857 | Succeeded by Charles Grenfell; R. A. Cross |
Baronetage of England
| Preceded by William Strickland | Baronet (of Boynton); 1834–1874 | Succeeded by Charles Strickland |
