= Peter Hesketh-Fleetwood =

English politician

The Right Honourable Sir Peter Hesketh-Fleetwood Bt
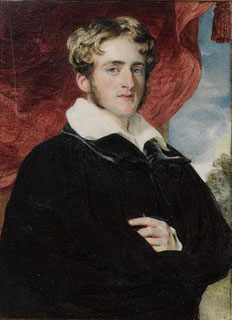
- Peter Hesketh-Fleetwood painted by William Charles Ross in 1826.

Member of Parliament for Preston
- In office 10 December 1832 – 29 July 1847 Serving with: Henry Smith-Stanley 1832–1837; Robert Townley Parker 1837–1841; George Strickland 1841–1847
- Preceded by: Henry Hunt; John Wood
- Succeeded by: Charles Pascoe-Grenfell; George Strickland

Personal details
- Born: 9 May 1801 Wennington Hall, Wennington, England
- Died: 12 April 1866 (aged 64) Piccadilly, London, England
- Resting place: Kensal Green Cemetery, London, England
- Party: Tory (1832–1834); Conservative (1834–1837); Whig (1837–1847)
- Spouses: Eliza Debonnaire Metcalfe (m. 1826) Virginie Marie Garcia (m. 1837)
- Parents: Robert Hesketh; Maria Rawlinson
- Education: Trinity College, Oxford

Fleetwood
- Arms of Fleetwood: Party per pale nebuly azure and or, six martlets, 2, 2 and 2 counterchanged
- Country: England

Sir Peter Hesketh-Fleetwood, 1st Baronet, (9 May 1801 – 12 April 1866) was an English landowner, developer and Member of Parliament who founded the town of Fleetwood, in Lancashire, England.

Born Peter Hesketh, he changed his name by Royal assent to Hesketh-Fleetwood, incorporating the name of his ancestors, and was later created Baronet Fleetwood. Predeceased by an older brother, he inherited estates in west Lancashire in 1824. Inspired by the transport developments of the early 19th century, he decided to bring the railway to the Lancashire coast and develop a holiday resort and port. He hired architect Decimus Burton to design his new town, which he named Fleetwood; construction began in 1836. Hesketh-Fleetwood was instrumental in the formation of the Preston and Wyre Railway Company and with his financial support, a railway line was built between Preston and Fleetwood which opened in 1840.

Hesketh-Fleetwood married twice and had several children, most of whom died in infancy. His new town flourished, but the expense of building it left him close to bankruptcy and forced him to sell most of his estates including Rossall Hall, which had been his family home. He left Lancashire and died in London, succeeded by his son Louis.

== Early life and family ==
Peter Hesketh was born in 1801 at Wennington Hall, in Wennington, near Lancaster, the second son of Robert and Maria (née Rawlinson) Hesketh. He had an older brother, Edward, a younger brother, Charles, and a younger sister, Anna. He was descended (through his father's paternal grandmother) from the Fleetwood family who had owned the large Rossall estate in West Lancashire for over 200 years. Robert inherited the estate in 1819 on the death of his elder brother, Bold, and the family relocated to the manor house, Rossall Hall, on the Fylde coast. On Robert's death in 1824, the estate passed to Peter, his elder brother Edward having predeceased him in 1820. By that time the family's land extended from Heysham in the north, to North Meols, near Southport, in the south, and encompassed most of the Fylde.

Hesketh was educated, along with his younger brother Charles, at Trinity College, Oxford. Although Charles was a studious young man, who planned to enter the church on graduation, Peter had an active social life in both Oxford and London. He holidayed in southern resorts including St Leonards-on-Sea, a new development in Sussex, where he admired the work of architect James Burton. He became close friends with Burton's son Decimus, who was also an architect. The two men were involved in the formation of London's Athenaeum Club and Burton designed the club's building in Pall Mall. Hesketh received his Bachelor of Arts degree in 1823 and his Master of Arts degree in 1826. That same year, he married Eliza Debonnaire Metcalfe, the daughter of Sir Theophilus Metcalfe, 2nd Baronet, commonly known by her middle name. Debonnaire's father gave the couple a house in Dover, but they also spent time at the Rossall estate. The couple were very close to Charles and his new wife Anna, and their sister Anna, and her husband Thomas Knowlys. Charles was ordained in 1828 and as patron of St Chad's Church in Poulton-le-Fylde, Peter presented his brother with that curacy.

Hesketh enjoyed looking after the Rossall estate (which may have had no steward or agent, but his family is known to have engaged Giles Thornber of Bispham as steward prior to the death of Robert Hesketh, and Frederick Kemp is named as steward in 1825). However, he struggled to keep on top of finances, and was an indulgent landlord. He became an enthusiastic member of the Lancashire Agricultural Society and was concerned about the fate of local farm workers who were losing their jobs because of increased mechanisation. Hesketh was gradually becoming more interested in the lives and conditions of the working classes.

The Heskeths' first child, Anna Maria (known as Maria to distinguish her from three close relatives named Anna), was born in 1827. Three more children—named Metcalfe Bold, Debonnaire and Frances—all died in infancy. In 1831 Hesketh changed his name by royal licence to Hesketh-Fleetwood, incorporating the better-known family name of his ancestors into his own. Debonnaire contracted tuberculosis and died in early 1833. Shortly before Debonnaire's death Hesketh-Fleetwood contracted scarlet fever. This was followed by erysipelas, a bacterial infection so severe that it necessitated the removal of one of his eyes. At the end of the year, the Rossall estate was severely flooded and suffered damage costing about £3,000 to repair. Hesketh-Fleetwood subsequently spent very little time at Rossall.

In 1837 in Belgium, Hesketh-Fleetwood married Virginie Marie Garcia, the daughter of Don Pedro Garcia, a Spanish nobleman. Maria, his daughter with Debonnaire, contracted tuberculosis and died in 1838 at Regent's Park, aged 11. She was interred in a glass coffin in the family vault at St Chad's, Poulton. Around the same time as Maria's death, Virginie gave birth to a son, Peter Louis. In 1841, on the death of his aunt, Anna Maria Hesketh, Hesketh-Fleetwood succeeded to Tulketh Hall in Preston.

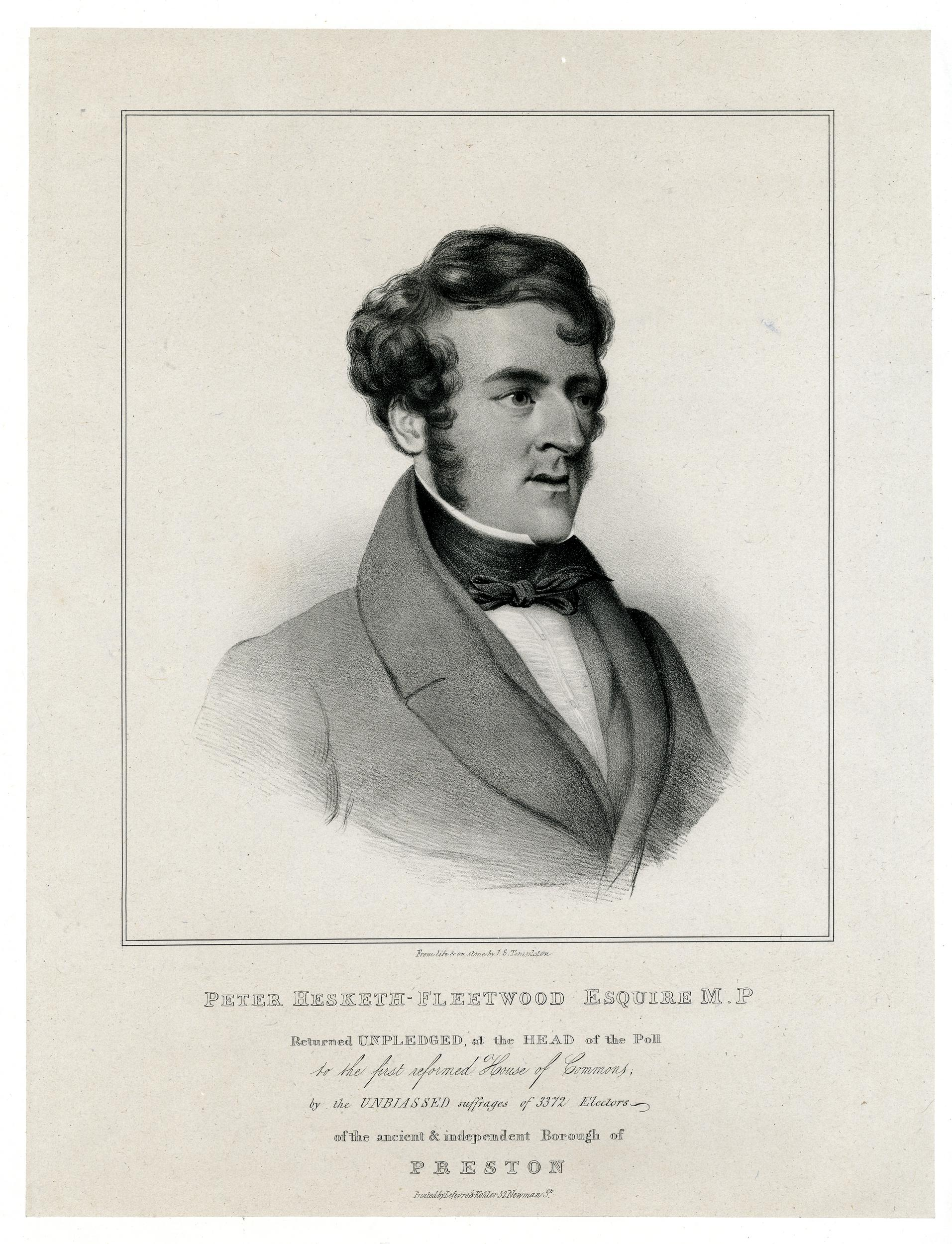
Lithographic portrait of Peter Hesketh-Fleetwood, c.1840.

== Politics ==
Hesketh was appointed High Sheriff of Lancashire in 1830. In 1831 he was invited to stand as a Tory Party candidate for the constituency of Preston. He had similar views to Tory statesman Robert Peel and readily agreed to stand. Hesketh-Fleetwood opposed monopolies, slavery and capital punishment and was in favour of reforming the Corn Laws. At the 1832 general election, he was elected—along with his friend, Henry Smith-Stanley—Member of Parliament for Preston, in the first parliament following the Reform Act. He made his maiden speech to parliament in 1834.

Queen Victoria came to the throne in 1837, and in June the following year Hesketh-Fleetwood was knighted in the Coronation honours list and created Baronet Fleetwood. He remained MP for Preston until the 1847 general election, although towards the end of his parliamentary career he was recorded as a Liberal MP. In 1840 he translated Victor Hugo's pamphlet, The Last Day of a Condemned Man, with a foreword entitled "Observations on capital punishment" that made clear Hesketh-Fleetwood's abolitionist stance on the issue.

== Development of Fleetwood ==
As a student holidaying in coastal towns, Hesketh had become aware of the lack of resorts in Lancashire. He was concerned that the working classes of Lancashire could not afford to travel south for their holidays as wealthy people like him could. The number of railways in Great Britain steadily increased in the first half of the 19th century, and Hesketh was impressed by the arrival in 1828 of the steam locomotive in Lancashire. As High Sheriff of Lancashire, he attended the opening of the Liverpool and Manchester Railway on 15 December 1830. The event filled him with great excitement at the idea of bringing the railway to the coast and enabling Lancashire mill workers to take day-trips to the seaside.

As he discussed the idea with his brother Charles, Hesketh soon realised that day-trippers would need certain facilities that were not yet available, and decided that a new town would need to be built. He initially planned to site his town and railway terminus near the village of Thornton, but it was not close enough to the coast for his liking. He eventually decided on Rossall Point, a small peninsula north of Rossall Hall, at the mouth of the River Wyre, which was then an uninhabited rabbit warren. Although bleak and waterlogged, the area had views of Morecambe Bay and the Lake District.

Hesketh was influenced in the early planning stages by his friends, including mill owners Samuel Fielden and Benjamin Whitworth. They pointed out that mill workers would not wish to make day trips to the seaside all year round, and wondered how the people of the new town would be occupied during the winter months. They encouraged Hesketh to build a new port; because charges at Liverpool were on the rise, and there were no reasonable alternatives for Manchester mill owners, both Whitworth and Fielden agreed that they would make good use of a port on the Fylde coast. Hesketh soon found that he was not the only one thinking of extending the railway, or of building a new port. He had competition from the residents of Lytham, a village about 13 miles (21 km) south of Rossall, at the mouth of the River Ribble. They were already planning the formation of the Preston Port Company; Hesketh acted quickly and applied to the official railway committee to have a port built on the River Wyre. The committee agreed to hear all applications.

Charles met Frederick Kemp, a land agent newly arrived in Poulton from his native Essex, and introduced him to his brother, who was on the lookout for a steward or agent. Kemp, well-dressed and charming, made a good impression on Hesketh, who employed him immediately. At the meeting of the railway committee Hesketh put forward a persuasive argument. Despite opposition from the Lytham contingent the committee decided that Rossall Point was the best place for the railway terminus to be built, and the Railway and Port Company was formed. In the early 19th century it was thought that steam locomotives would be unable to negotiate hilly terrain, and that Lake District hills like Shap Fell would prevent the railway from reaching Scotland. The Fylde terminus would have even more importance than Hesketh had hoped, providing a sea link for passengers from London to travel on to Scotland. Initially Hesketh had considered naming his new town New Liverpool or Wyreton, but after changing his name to Hesketh-Fleetwood in 1831 he decided to call it Fleetwood. With a new career in parliament to prepare for, he readily handed over financial management of the project to his manager, Frederick Kemp.

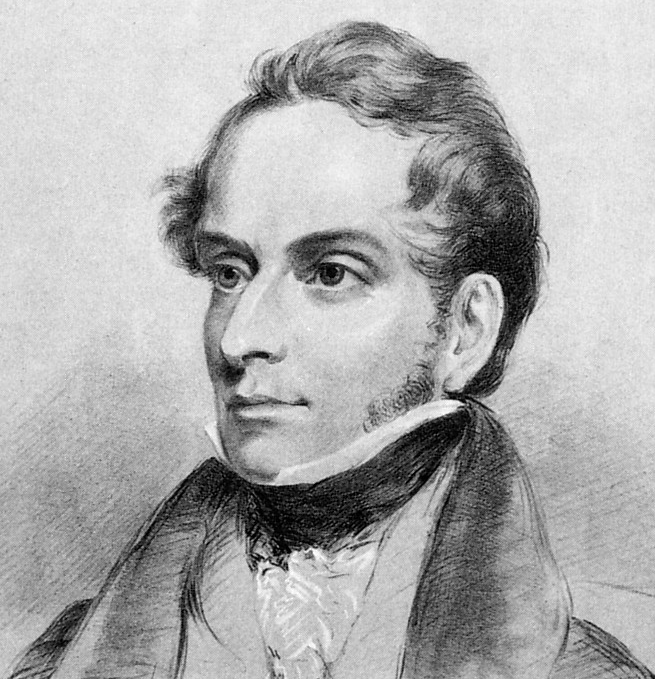
Fleetwood architect Decimus Burton

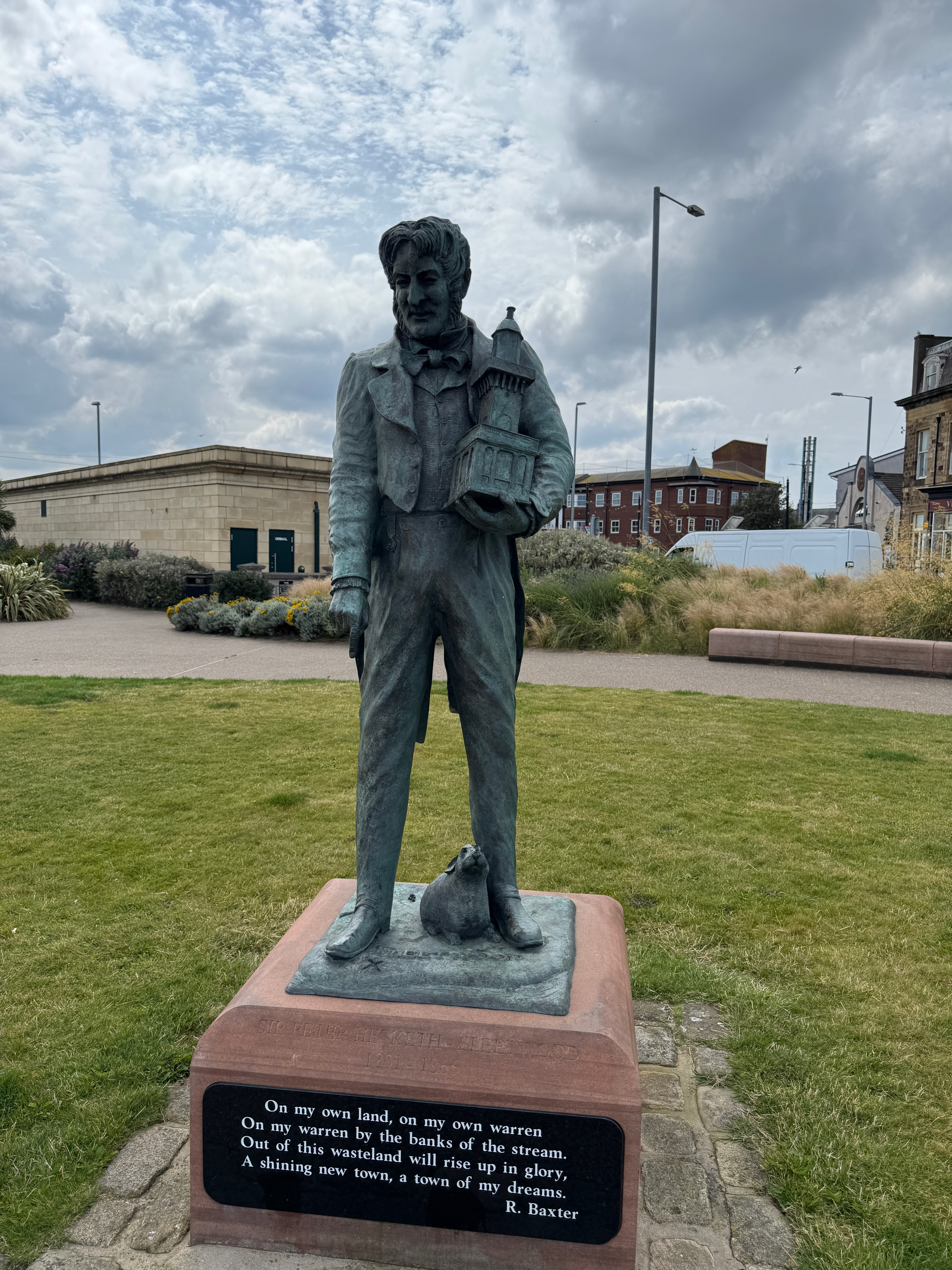
Statue of Hesketh-Fleetwood in Euston Park, Fleetwood, near the North Euston Hotel. He is holding a model of Fleetwood's Lower Lighthouse

After Debonnaire's death in 1833, Hesketh-Fleetwood immersed himself in his development plans. Southport, a town he owned much of, was becoming a popular sea bathing resort, and Hesketh-Fleetwood organised the construction of a promenade. He was becoming concerned over delays on the part of the Railway and Port Company and decided to get on with building Fleetwood. He hired his old friend Decimus Burton, who had become a successful architect, and together they discussed what buildings would be required. Hesketh-Fleetwood wanted a church, docks, housing, a gas office, a school and a hotel. Burton agreed that a hotel would be important for passengers to spend the night before travelling on to Scotland. Because those passengers would be arriving from Euston railway station in London, Hesketh-Fleetwood decided to call the hotel the North Euston Hotel. Burton's plans were ready by 1835.

In 1835, still frustrated by the lack of activity on the part of the Railway and Port Company, Hesketh-Fleetwood organised the formation of the Preston and Wyre Railway Company to raise the funds required to bring the railway to Fleetwood. The estimated cost was £122,000. The company obtained Royal assent to start construction, with an underwritten guarantee from Hesketh-Fleetwood. The following year Hesketh-Fleetwood and Burton oversaw the marking out of Fleetwood's first street, and the first railway lines were laid.

By 1838 it had become clear that construction costs for the town were spiralling out of control. To make matters worse, the railway's engineer informed Hesketh-Fleetwood that the cost of the railway was expected to exceed £300,000. The company had also sold far fewer shares than had been hoped. Frederick Kemp was collecting rents and rates from tenants, and Hesketh-Fleetwood repeatedly asked him for money to pay some of the mounting bills. Kemp, a more forceful character than his employer, kept claiming that there was no money. Hesketh-Fleetwood turned to his brother Charles and asked him to get £4,000 out of Kemp. Charles was more assertive, but Kemp said that the money had been spent on workers' wages and produced yet more invoices that needed to be paid. During Hesketh-Fleetwood's many absences from the Fylde, Kemp managed to involve himself in a number of enterprises in the town, to his own financial advantage. The railway was taking longer than expected and, with mounting debts, Hesketh-Fleetwood grew increasingly depressed and began to withdraw from society.

Construction of the railway was finally completed in 1840, and in July the Preston and Wyre Railway opened. The following year St Peter's Church was finished, and Hesketh-Fleetwood appointed as vicar the Rev. St. Vincent Beechey of Hilgay in Norfolk. Also in 1841, the North Euston was the fourth hotel to open in the town. Steamer services opened to the Isle of Man, Whitehaven, Ardrossan and Belfast. Fleetwood initially flourished, but Hesketh-Fleetwood had run out of money and was compelled to take out mortgages. He lost the £75,000 he had invested in the Preston and Wyre Railway Company owing to a lack of accounts. Kemp claimed that Hesketh-Fleetwood owed him money, but Kemp refused to explain his book-keeping. In the face of enormous debts Hesketh-Fleetwood sold his estates at Blackpool, Southport, Meols Hall, and Tulketh Hall. Charles bought the Churchtown estate, where he and his wife had been living, from his brother. In 1844 Hesketh-Fleetwood auctioned off his personal possessions from Rossall Hall and left Lancashire. The Rev. St. Vincent Beechey had set up the Northern Church of England School for boys. Close to bankruptcy, Hesketh-Fleetwood leased the buildings at Rossall Hall to the school for six years, with the option to buy it after nine for £7,000. Thereafter, the school was called Rossall School.

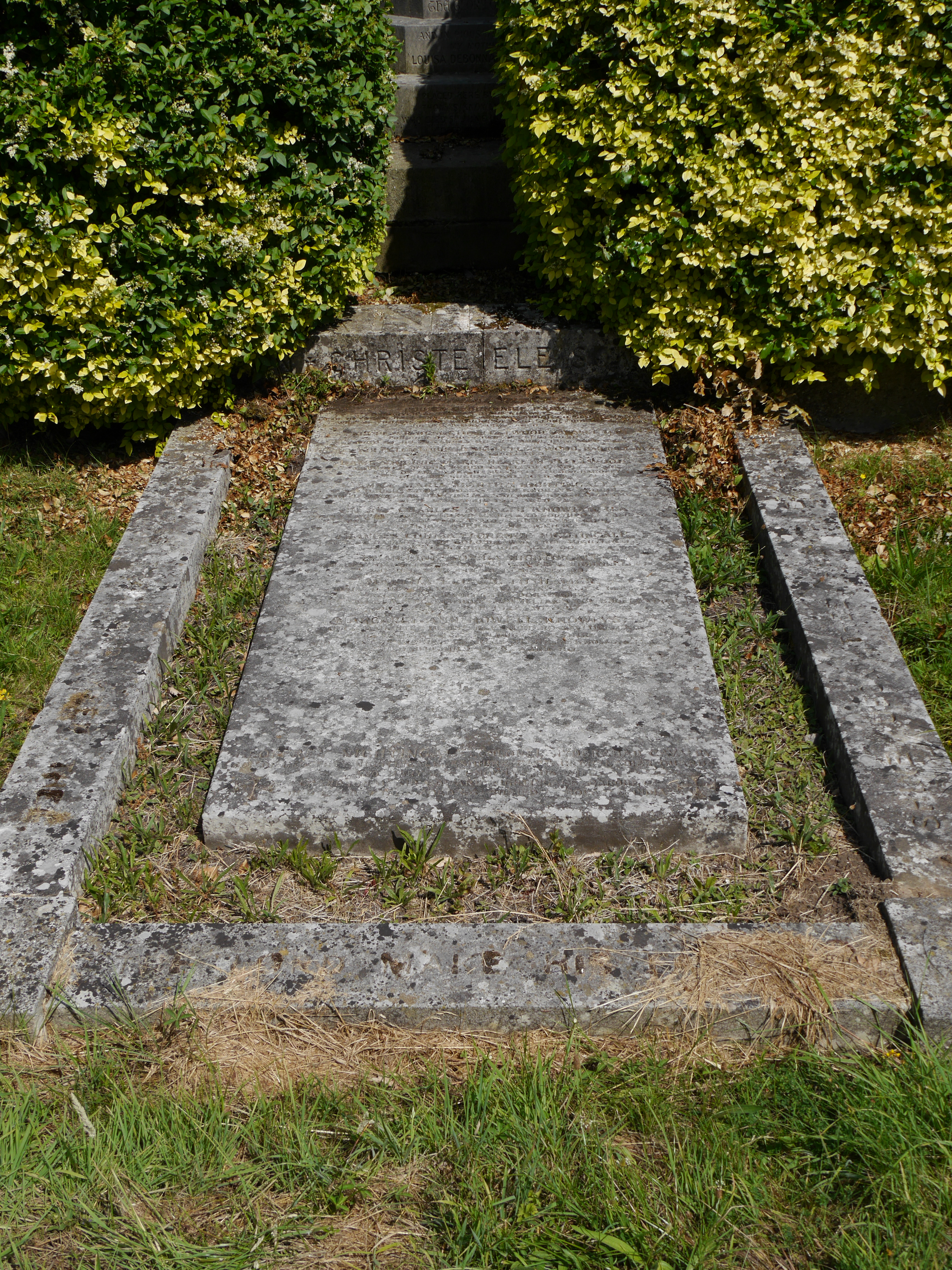
Grave, Kensal Green Cemetery

Fleetwood continued to grow without its principal investor, albeit slowly. As a port, it soon faced competition from Lytham and Preston. In 1847 Queen Victoria and Prince Albert travelled through Fleetwood on their way to London from Scotland, but that year saw the decline of the town's importance on the route to Scotland. More powerful locomotives were now able to travel over hilly terrain, and the railway was extended over Shap Fell all the way to Scotland; Fleetwood was no longer needed as a sea link.

== Later life and death ==
Hesketh-Fleetwood moved to London with Virginie and their son Louis. He rarely visited Lancashire again, and in 1847 he retired from politics. The family spent some time living in Virginie's home country, Spain. In 1861 Hesketh-Fleetwood expressed an intention to return to politics, but was prevented from doing so by his failing health. He died at his home in Piccadilly, London on 12 April 1866, following a lengthy illness. He is buried at Kensal Green Cemetery. His son Rev. Peter Louis Hesketh-Fleetwood (1838–1880) succeeded to the baronetcy, which became extinct on his death. What was left of Hesketh-Fleetwood's land in Lancashire was bought by the Fleetwood Estate Company in 1875.

Parliament of the United Kingdom
Preceded by Henry Hunt; John Wood	Member of Parliament for Preston; 1832–1847; With: Henry Smith-Stanley 1832–1837; Robert Townley Parker 1837–1841; Sir George Strickland 1841–1847	Succeeded by Charles Pascoe Grenfell; Sir George Strickland
Baronetage of the United Kingdom
New creation	Baronet (of Rossall Hall); 1838–1866	Succeeded by Peter Hesketh-Fleetwood
