= Charles Pressly =

Sir Charles Pressly, KCB (1794 – 1 February 1880) was an English civil servant.

Born in Warminster in 1794, he was educated privately in Warminster and Midhurst and practised as a solicitor before entering the Solicitor's Office of Stamps in 1818; he was shortly afterwards appointed its chief clerk.

In the early 1820s, a succession of Royal Commissions were established to investigate the stamp offices in Ireland (1823), Scotland (1824) and England (1826), and Pressly advised each of them. He was appointed secretary to the new Board of Stamps for Ireland, and in 1826, following the Royal Commission's report, was also appointed secretary to the Board of Stamps for England. The latter was shortly afterwards amalgamated with the Board of Taxes, and Pressly became secretary of the new consolidated board. In 1848, the Boards of Taxes, Excise and Stamps were merged into the Board of Inland Revenue, and Pressly became a member of the board; he became its deputy chairman in 1855. The board's chairman John Wood died in 1856 and Pressly succeeded him as chairman, remaining in office until 1862. He remained a special commissioner for income tax until 1864.

Pressly was appointed a Companion of the Order of the Bath (CB) in 1861 and promoted to Knight Commander in 1866. He died on 1 February 1880.

Government offices
| Preceded by John Wood | Chairman, Board of Inland Revenue; 1856–1862 | Succeeded by Sir William Henry Stephenson |
