= Walter Strickland, 9th Baronet =

English translator and radical (1851–1938)

Walter William Strickland, de jure 9th Baronet (26 May 1851 – 9 August 1938) was an English translator and radical. He became known as the "Anarchist Baronet" because he wandered around the world for much of his life espousing radical causes. After receiving Czechoslovak citizenship in 1923, he renounced his British citizenship and later moved to Java.

== Biography ==
Strickland was born in Westminster while the family estate was at Hildenley Hall near Malton, North Yorkshire. He was educated at Edinburgh Academy and Trinity College, Cambridge. He was the eldest son of Sir Charles Strickland, 8th Baronet (1819–1909), the only child of his first marriage to Georgina, daughter of Sir William Milner, 4th Baronet, but never formally used the title he inherited upon his father's death.

In 1888, he married Eliza Vokes (1860–1946). A polyglot fluent in ancient and modern languages, he wrote several books and pamphlets and translated works of the Czech poet Vítězslav Hálek, as well as Molière and Horace.

He has been linked with the Voynich manuscript. He may have met Wilfrid Voynich during his first years in London, when Voynich was directly involved in the political activities of Russian refugees in London, under the leadership of Sergey Stepnyak-Kravchinsky, who founded the SFRF (Society of Friends of Russian Freedom) and the RFPF (Russian Free Press Fund).

In the early 1890s, Strickland went to live abroad. In 1911, he sold the family home, which became a convent. After 1912, he did not live in England. Strickland spent some time in Russia and in 1923 became a citizen of Czechoslovakia, formally renouncing his British citizenship and that he would not be using the title. (There is no mechanism for a baronet to renounce the title, although it is possible to cease using it during his lifetime.) Strickland died in Batavia, Netherlands on 9 August 1938.

== Political beliefs ==
Strickland had libertarian, socialist (Bohemian) and atheist ideas. His anti-British and anti-imperialist activities were widely reported in the English-speaking press, particularly The Times and Daily Express, making him somewhat of a celebrity, while his wandering led him to be dubbed a "gypsy."

Strickland believed he was the subject of assassination plots by the British. In a letter to a London newspaper, he wrote, "The vulgar, ungentlemanly, and, indeed, murderous persecution to which I have been subjected is exclusively British." According to British intelligence, Strickland was thought to be of "doubtful sanity."

In 1909, Guy Aldred, founder of the Glasgow Anarchist Group, was sentenced to 12 months' hard labour for printing the August issue of The Indian Sociologist, an Indian nationalist newspaper edited by Shyamji Krishnavarma. Strickland heard of Aldred's action and sent him a telegram of congratulations at the prison and a cheque for £10. Several of his writings were published in The Indian Sociologist between 1911 and 1914.

As related by Albert Meltzer:

"After the publication of Hyde Park in 1938 support for Aldred in London fell off and he had burned his bridges in London and Glasgow, but then an extraordinary chance ended his days of poverty. Sir Walter Strickland, a millionaire whose family practically owned Malta, had during the First World War taken to him and was disgusted with the British Government after the Versailles Treaty. In acknowledgment of the newly created State of Czechoslovakia, the first fruits of League of Nations liberal idealism, Strickland became naturalised Czech (1923), though he never went to that country. In 1938 Strickland died and left a fortune to Aldred, who promptly formed the Strickland Press, bought a hall, bookshop and machinery and proceeded reprinting all his old pamphlets, before actually getting the money. Then the Strickland relatives brought a suit saying the will was invalid. Strickland had said in his will he left the money to Aldred "for socialist and atheist propaganda", illegal under Czech law. There was a complicated legal case which ended as such things usually do, with the money in the hands of the lawyers. Aldred, used to defending his own cases personally and handling courts with ease on matters of obstruction and sedition, found himself outgunned among the moneyed lawyers."

Baronetage of England
Preceded by Charles Strickland	Baronet (of Boynton); 1909–1938	Succeeded by Henry Strickland-Constable
