= Edward Smith-Stanley, 13th Earl of Derby =

British politician (1775–1851)

The Right Honourable The Earl of Derby KG
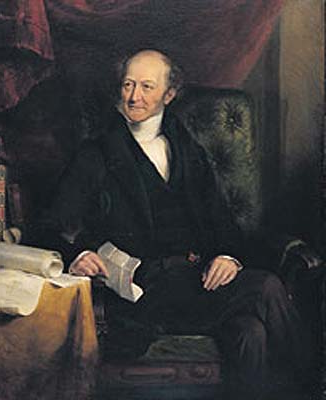
- Portrait by William Derby, c. 1837
- Born: 21 April 1775; Knowsley Hall, Lancashire
- Died: 30 June 1851 (aged 76); Knowsley Hall, Lancashire
- Spouse: Charlotte Margaret Hornby (m. 1798; died 1817)
- Issue: Edward Smith-Stanley, 14th Earl of Derby; Charlotte Elizabeth Smith-Stanley; Henry Smith-Stanley
- Father: Edward Smith-Stanley, 12th Earl of Derby
- Mother: Lady Elizabeth Hamilton

Edward Smith-Stanley, 13th Earl of Derby (21 April 1775 – 30 June 1851), styled Lord Stanley from 1776 to 1832, and Baron Stanley of Bickerstaffe from 1832 to 1834, was an English politician, peer, landowner, builder, farmer, art collector and naturalist. He was the patron of the writer Edward Lear.

== Origins ==
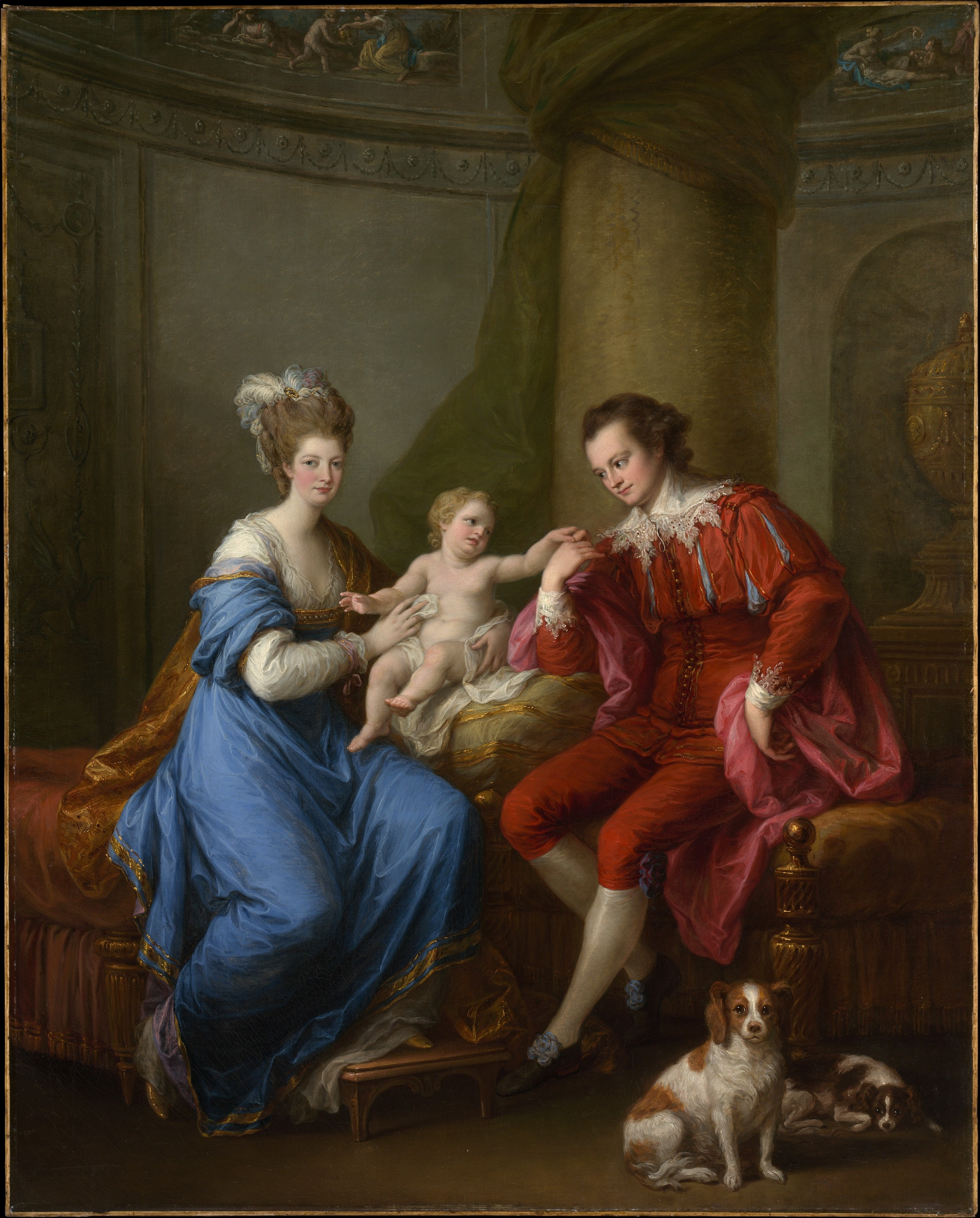
Edward Smith Stanley, 12th Earl of Derby, Elizabeth Hamilton, and Their Son, Edward Smith Stanley, future 13th Earl, by Angelica Kauffman, circa 1776

He was the eldest child and only son and heir of Edward Smith-Stanley, 12th Earl of Derby (1752–1834), by his wife Elizabeth Hamilton, a daughter of James Hamilton, 6th Duke of Hamilton.

== Career ==
He was educated at Eton College and Trinity College, Cambridge. On 10 November 1796 he was appointed a Deputy Lieutenant of Lancashire and in the same year he was elected as a Member of Parliament for Preston. He held this seat until 1812 and then represented Lancashire until 1832, when he was ennobled as Baron Stanley of Bickerstaffe, of Bickerstaffe in the County Palatine of Lancaster.

=== Military career ===
He was commissioned Colonel of the 1st Royal Lancashire Supplementary Militia on 1 March 1797; this regiment subsequently became the 2nd Royal Lancashire Militia. He was breveted as a colonel in the regular Army with seniority from that date, retaining the rank until his regiment was disembodied, which occurred at the end of 1799. He resigned his commission as colonel on 13 April 1847.

== Naturalist ==
In 1834 he succeeded his father as Earl of Derby and withdrew from politics, instead concentrating on his natural history collection at Knowsley Hall, near Liverpool. He had a large collection of living animals: at his death, there were 1,272 birds and 345 mammals at Knowsley, shipped to England by explorers such as Joseph Burke. From 1828 to 1833 he was President of the Linnean Society. Many of Derby's collections are now housed in Liverpool's World Museum. Several species were named after him, for example the Derbyan parakeet, Psittacula derbiana and an Australian species of parrot named firstly by Nicholas Vigors as Platycercus stanleyii, in 1830 when he was Lord Stanley, and referred to in the vernacular as "The Earl of Derby’s Parrakeet" by the author John Gould in the sixth volume of his magnum opus Birds of Australia. However the latter species was found to have been named previously as Platycercus icterotis, and thus Platycercus stanleyii was found to have been an invalid name due to the pre-existence of a published description for the species, according to "the inviolable laws of precedence in deliberations on biological nomenclature". From the Earl of Derby's Collection, the State Library of NSW purchased six volumes of exquisite Australian natural history drawings dating from the early days of British settlement in NSW and this Library publishes talks and exhibitions of its research on this collection.

He founded in 1851 with his natural history's collection a museum in Liverpool, the Derby Museum, the current World Museum, the oldest of the National Museums Liverpool group.

== Marriage and issue ==
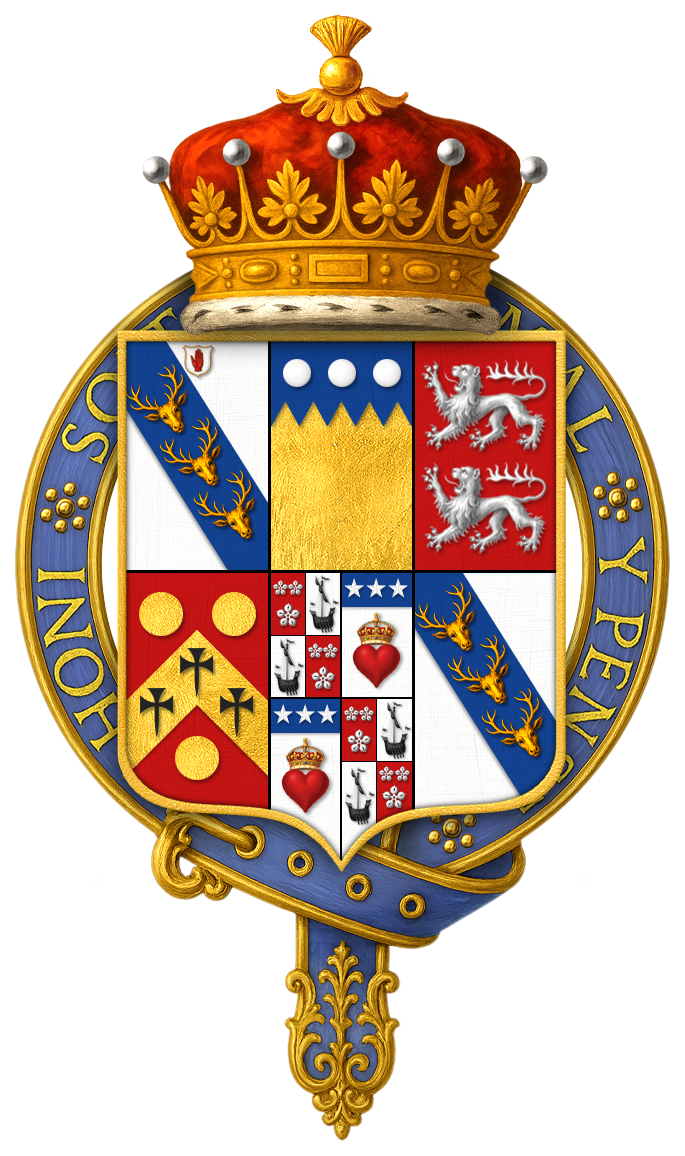
Quartered arms of the 13th Earl of Derby

On 30 June 1798, Smith-Stanley married his cousin Charlotte Margaret Hornby (d.1817), second daughter of Rev. Geoffrey Hornby (1750–1812), of Scale Hall, near Lancaster in Lancashire, High Sheriff of Lancashire in 1774 and a Deputy Lieutenant of Lancashire, Colonel of a regiment of Lancashire militia, by his wife Hon. Lucy Smith-Stanley (d.1833), the earl's aunt and a daughter of James Smith-Stanley, Lord Strange (1716–1771). Charlotte's brother was Edmund Hornby (1773–1857) of Dalton Hall, near Burton, Westmorland, a Member of Parliament for Preston, Lancashire, from 1812–1826, who married the earl's sister Lady Charlotte Stanley (d.1805).

By Charlotte Hornby, he had issue:

- Edward George Geoffrey Smith-Stanley, 14th Earl of Derby (1799–1869), thrice Prime Minister (1852, 1858–9, 1866–8)
- Lady Charlotte Elizabeth Smith-Stanley (11 July 1801 – 15 February 1853), married in 1823 Edward Penrhyn
- Hon. Henry Thomas Smith-Stanley (1803–1875), MP for Preston (1832–7)
- Hon. Emily Lucy Smith-Stanley (2 May – 15 November 1804), died in infancy
- Hon. Louisa Emily Stanley (1 June 1805 – 11 December 1825), married in June 1825 Lt.-Col. Samuel Long
- Lady Eleanor Mary Smith-Stanley (3 May 1807 – 11 September 1887), married in 1835 Rev. Frank George Hopwood, Rector of Winwick, Lancashire
- Colonel Hon. Charles James Fox Stanley (25 April 1808 – 13 October 1884), married in 1836 Frances Augusta, daughter of Gen. Sir Henry Frederick Campbell

He died on 30 June 1851 at his seat, Knowsley Hall.

Parliament of Great Britain
Preceded by William Cunliffe Shawe; Sir Henry Hoghton, Bt	Member of Parliament for Preston; 1796–1800; With: Sir Henry Hoghton, Bt	Parliament of Great Britain abolished
Parliament of the United Kingdom
New parliament	Member of Parliament for Preston; 1801–1812; With: Sir Henry Hoghton, Bt 1801–1802; John Horrocks 1802–1804; Samuel Horrocks 1804–1812	Succeeded by Edmund Hornby; Samuel Horrocks
Preceded by Thomas Stanley; John Blackburne	Member of Parliament for Lancashire; 1812–1832; With: John Blackburne 1812–1830; John Wilson-Patten 1830–1831; Benjamin Heywood 1831–1832	Constituency divided
Honorary titles
Vacant Title last held by The Duke of Hamilton	Vice-Admiral of Lancashire; 1831–1851	Vacant
Preceded by The Earl of Derby	Lord Lieutenant of Lancashire; 1834–1851	Succeeded by The Earl of Sefton
Peerage of England
Preceded by Edward Smith-Stanley	Earl of Derby; 1834–1851	Succeeded by Edward Smith-Stanley
Peerage of the United Kingdom
New title	Baron Stanley of Bickerstaffe; 1832–1851	Succeeded by Edward Smith-Stanley
