= Algernon West =

The Right Honourable Sir Algernon Edward West GCB JP
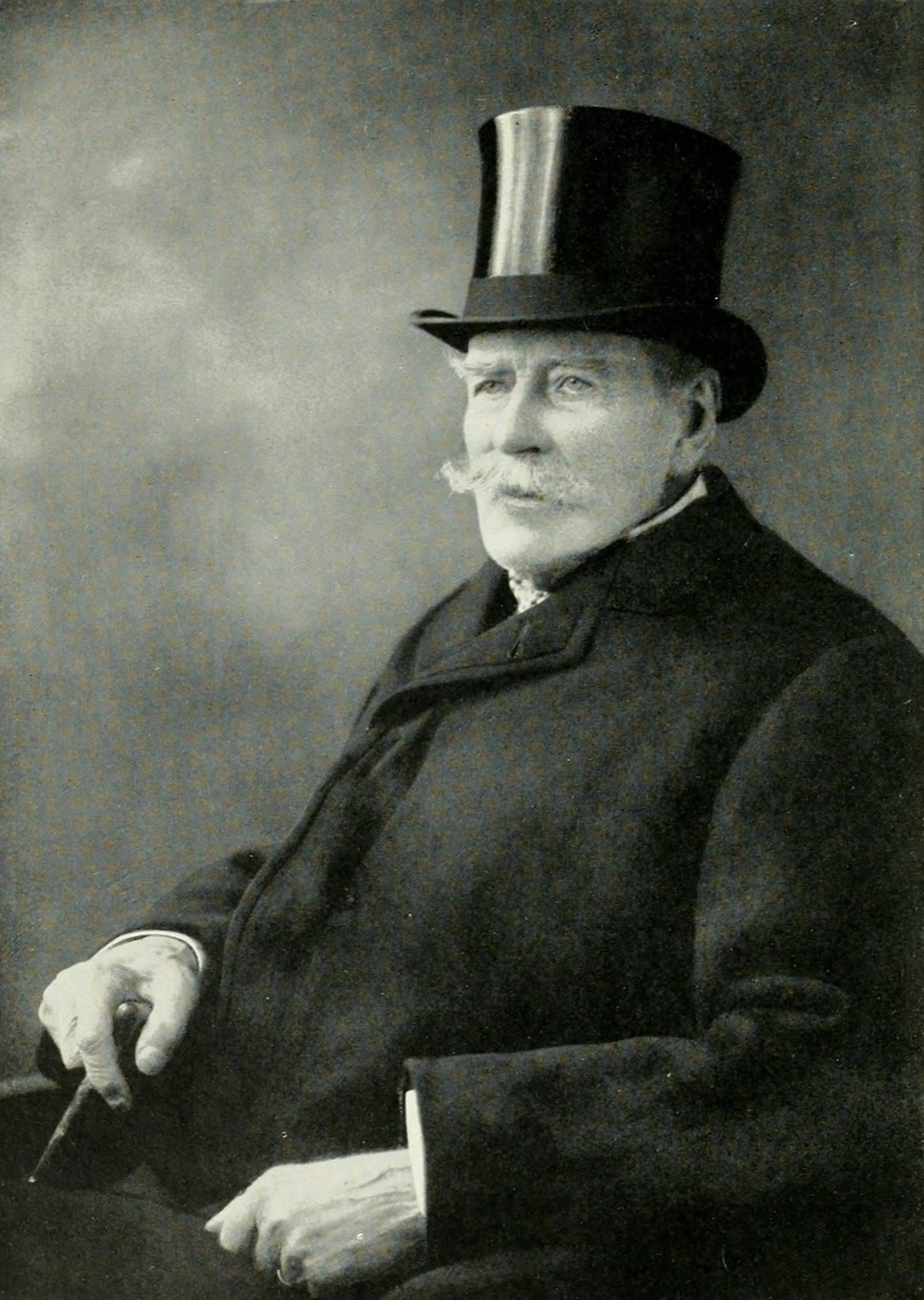
- Born: 4 April 1832; 5 New Street, London
- Died: 21 March 1921 (aged 88); Manchester Square, London
- Education: Eton, Christ Church, Oxford
- Known for: Private Secretary to William Gladstone, 1861–1894
- Spouse: Mary Elizabeth Caroline West (1833–1894)
- Children: Horace Charles George West (b. 1859); Reginald Jervoise West (1861–1921); Constance Mary West (b. 1862); Gilbert Richard West (1863–1892); Augustus William West (b. 1866)
- Parent(s): Martin John West (d. 1870) and Maria Walpole (d. 1870)

Sir Algernon Edward West GCB JP (4 April 1832 – 21 March 1921) was an English civil servant. He acted as Principal Private Secretary to Prime Minister William Gladstone.

== Biography ==
He was the third son of Martin John West and Lady Maria Walpole, third daughter of Horatio Walpole, 2nd Earl of Orford; Edward West was his uncle. He was educated at Eton College and Christ Church, Oxford, where he matriculated in 1850. He left after two terms, becoming a clerk in the Inland Revenue, and then transferring to the Admiralty.

West was Private Secretary to Gladstone between 1861 and 1894. He was a Progressive Party Alderman of London County Council from 1898 to 1907. He held the office of Justice of the Peace (JP) for Middlesex. He held the office of Chairman of the Board of the Inland Revenue. He was invested as a Knight Commander of the Order of the Bath (KCB) on 30 July 1886. He was promoted to a Knight Grand Cross of the order (GCB) in the 1902 Coronation Honours list published on 26 June 1902, and was invested by King Edward VII at Buckingham Palace on 8 August 1902. He was later invested as a Privy Counsellor (PC).

From 1880, West lived at the manor at Wanborough, Surrey. West entertained many political figures at the manor including Gladstone, Queen Victoria and Bismarck.

West was also a director of the South Eastern Railway and he caused a new station, named Wanborough but actually at Normandy, to be opened in 1891. In 1900, Wanborough Manor was passed on to H. H. Asquith until he became prime minister. In 1908, West returned to stay in the manor until his death in 1921.

== Family ==
West married Mary Elizabeth Caroline Barrington, daughter of Hon. George Barrington and Lady Caroline Grey (daughter of Charles Grey, 2nd Earl Grey), on 12 August 1858. Three sons and a daughter survived him.

Government offices
Preceded by Sir Charles Herries	Chairman, Board of Inland Revenue; 1881–1892	Succeeded by Sir Alfred Milner
