= Sir Charles Strickland, 8th Baronet =

British peer (1819-1909)

Sir Charles William Strickland, 8th Baronet (6 February 1819 – 31 December 1909) was an English barrister and a rower who was in the winning crew in the first Grand Challenge Cup at Henley Royal Regatta. He was President of the Yorkshire Philosophical Society.

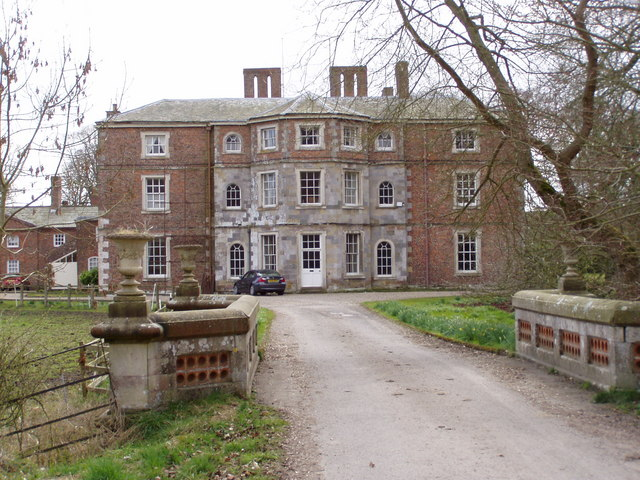
Boynton Hall - seat of the Strickland baronets

Strickland was born and died at Hildenley Hall, near Malton, Yorkshire. He was the eldest son of Sir George Strickland, 7th Baronet, of Boynton. He was educated at Rugby School where he is supposed to have been the original of the character 'Martin' in Tom Brown's Schooldays. He was admitted to Trinity College, Cambridge on 6 March 1837 and was also admitted at Lincoln's Inn on 11 March 1841.

Strickland married Georgina Selina Septima Milner, daughter of Sir William Mordaunt Sturt Milner, Bt on 19 September 1850 and they had a son Walter. He married secondly on 22 May 1866, Anne Elizabeth Nevile, daughter of Rev. Christopher Nevile, of Thorney, Nottinghamshire. They had a son Henry and a daughter.

He had two brothers, one of whom Frederick Strickland was a friend of Francis Galton and died in tragic circumstances according to Galton's description.

He rowed for Trinity College in the crew which won the first Grand Challenge Cup at Henley Royal Regatta in 1839. Strickland was called to the bar on 6 May 1847 and was also admitted at the Middle Temple on 6 February 1849.

Strickland was on the Northern Circuit and was chairman of the East Riding of Yorkshire Quarter Sessions. He succeeded his father in the baronetcy and to Boynton Hall on 23 December 1874. He was High Sheriff of Yorkshire in 1880.

Baronetage of England
Preceded by George Strickland	Baronet (of Boynton); 1874–1909	Succeeded by Walter Strickland
Honorary titles
Preceded by Charles Booth Elmsall Wright	High Sheriff of Yorkshire; 1880–1881	Succeeded by William Roundell
