= William Henry Stephenson =

Sir William Henry Stephenson, KCB (1811 – 1 March 1898) was an English civil servant.

Born in 1811, Stephenson was the son of General Sir Benjamin Charles Stephenson, GCH, by his wife, Maria, daughter of the Rev. Sir Peter Rivers. He was a page of honour to George IV at his coronation in 1820. In 1827, he entered HM Treasury as a clerk. He was private secretary to the prime minister, Sir Robert Peel, from 1841 to 1847. In 1862, William Gladstone appointed him chairman of the Board of Inland Revenue, in which office he remained until 1877. Though retired, he remained on the Commutation Board until 1897. He was elected to Middlesex County Council when it was created in 1889.

Stephenson was appointed a Knight Commander of the Order of the Bath (KCB) in 1871. He died on 1 March 1898 at his home in Uxbridge. He had married in 1838 Julia Elizabeth, daughter of William Richard Hamilton; she had died in 1883.

Government offices
Preceded by Charles Pressly	Chairman, Board of Inland Revenue; 1862–1871	Succeeded by Sir Charles Herries
