= Charles Herries =

Sir Charles John Herries, KCB (1815 – 14 March 1883) was a British civil servant.

Born in 1815, Herries was educated at Eton College and Trinity College, Cambridge, graduating in 1837. In 1842, he was appointed a commissioner of excise by Sir Robert Peel. He was then deputy chairman of the Board of Inland Revenue from 1856 to 1877, and its chairman from 1877 to 1881.

Herries was appointed a Companion of the Order of the Bath (CB) in 1871 and promoted to Knight Commander (KCB) in 1880. He died unmarried on 14 March 1883.

Government offices
Preceded by Sir William Henry Stephenson	Chairman, Board of Inland Revenue; 1871–1877	Succeeded by Sir Algernon West
