= Strickland-Constable baronets =

Title in the Baronetage of England

Arms of Strickland baronets

Arms of Strickland-Constable baronets

The Strickland, later Cholmley, later Strickland-Constable Baronetcy, of Boynton in the County of York, is a title in the Baronetage of England. It was created on 30 July 1641 for the politician William Strickland.

The first baronet was summoned to Oliver Cromwell's House of Lords as Lord Strickland. The second Baronet sat as Member of Parliament for Beverley during the Commonwealth. The third baronet was a politician and racehorse owner. The fourth baronet was also a politician and served as Secretary at War from 1730 to 1735. The first through fifth baronets all sat in Parliament.

The seventh baronet was a barrister and Whig politician. He married Mary, daughter and heiress of Reverend Charles Constable, of Wassand. In 1865, he succeeded to the substantial estates of Nathaniel Cholmley and assumed the same year by Royal permission the surname of Cholmley in lieu of his patronymic for himself and those of his heirs male who may succeeded to the Cholmley estates. However, his son and successor, the eighth Baronet, kept the surname Strickland. The ninth baronet became a Czechoslovak citizen and was known as the "Anarchist Baronet" for his radical views. Since the tenth Baronet succeeded to the title in 1938, the baronets have used the surname of Strickland-Constable, which his grandfather (third son of the seventh baronet) had adopted by royal licence in 1803 to succeed to his maternal grandfather's estates.

The first baronet's grandfather, navigator William Strickland, acquired the manor of Boynton in 1549 and the quarries at Hildenley, where the family built a mansion. Walter Strickland, younger brother of the first baronet, was a politician and diplomat. Another member of the family to gain distinction was Henry Strickland (1873–1934), fourth son of the eighth baronet. He was a captain in the Royal Navy.

The Boynton estate remained in the family until the 1950s. The stone-built Boynton Hall dates to the 15th century and Sir William Strickland, 4th Baronet was largely responsible for the interior refurbishment and landscapes of the present-day gardens.

== Strickland, later Cholmley, later Strickland-Constable baronets, of Boynton (1641) ==
- Sir William Strickland, 1st Baronet (c. 1596–1673)
- Sir Thomas Strickland, 2nd Baronet (c. 1639 – 20 November 1684)
- Sir William Strickland, 3rd Baronet (March 1665 – 12 May 1724)
- Sir William Strickland, 4th Baronet (c. 1686 – 1 September 1735)
- Sir George Strickland, 5th Baronet (March, 1729 – 13 January 1808)
- Sir William Strickland, 6th Baronet (12 March 1753 – 8 January 1834)
- Sir George Strickland, 7th Baronet (26 November 1782 – 23 December 1874) (assumed the surname of Cholmley by Royal licence in 1865)
- Sir Charles Strickland, 8th Baronet (6 February 1819 – 31 December 1909)
- Sir Walter Strickland, de jure 9th Baronet (26 May 1851 – 9 August 1938)
- Sir Henry Strickland-Constable, 10th Baronet (4 December 1900 – 26 March 1975)
- Sir Robert Strickland-Constable, 11th Baronet (22 October 1903 – 11 December 1994)
- Sir Frederic Strickland-Constable, 12th Baronet (born 21 October 1944)

The heir to the baronetcy is the present holder's only son, Charles (born 1985).
