= Henry Smith-Stanley =

British politician

The Hon. Henry Thomas Smith-Stanley (9 March 1803 – 2 April 1875) was a British politician. He was MP for Preston 1832–1837.

Smith-Stanley was the son of Edward Smith-Stanley, 13th Earl of Derby, and his wife, Charlotte Hornby. Edward Smith-Stanley, 14th Earl of Derby, three times Prime Minister, was Smith-Stanley's older brother.

He was educated at Eton College, and matriculated at Trinity College, Cambridge, in 1821. He transferred to St Mary Hall, Oxford, matriculating in 1826, aged 22.

He served as a JP and DL, and as MP for Preston 1832–1837.

He replaced his father as Colonel of the 2nd Royal Lancashire Militia (The Duke of Lancaster's Own) on 8 May 1847, but he resigned the following year in favour of his youngest brother.

He died on 2 April 1875.

== Family ==
Smith-Stanley married Anne Woolhouse, daughter of Richard Woolhouse, on 1 September 1835. They had four children:

- Edward Henry Stanley (5 January 1838 – )
- Charles Geoffrey Stanley (5 September 1839 – 22 April 1877)
- Henry Edmund Stanley (27 December 1840 – 15 November 1867)
- Charlotte Margaret Sidney Anne Stanley (5 August 1842 – 26 October 1872)

Parliament of the United Kingdom
Preceded by Henry Hunt; John Wood	Member of Parliament for Preston; 1832–1837; With: Peter Hesketh-Fleetwood	Succeeded by Peter Hesketh-Fleetwood; Robert Townley Parker
