= Henry Hunt (politician) =

British social reformer (1773–1835)

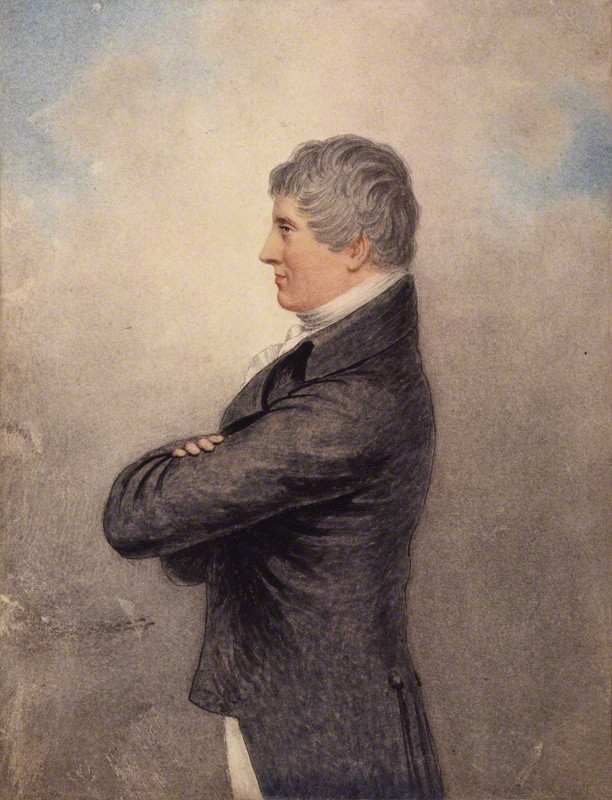
- Portrait by Adam Buck, c. 1810

Member of Parliament for Preston
- In office 1830–1832
- Preceded by: Hon. Edward Smith-Stanley
- Succeeded by: Peter Hesketh-Fleetwood

Personal details
- Party: Radical

Henry "Orator" Hunt (6 November 1773 – 13 February 1835) was an English radical speaker and agitator remembered as a pioneer of working-class radicalism and an important influence on the later Chartist movement. He advocated parliamentary reform and the repeal of the Corn Laws. He was the first member of parliament to advocate for women's suffrage; in 1832 he presented a petition to parliament from a woman asking for the right to vote. He was the leading figure in the events leading to the Peterloo massacre.

== Background ==
Hunt was born on 6 November 1773 in Upavon, Wiltshire.

== Career ==
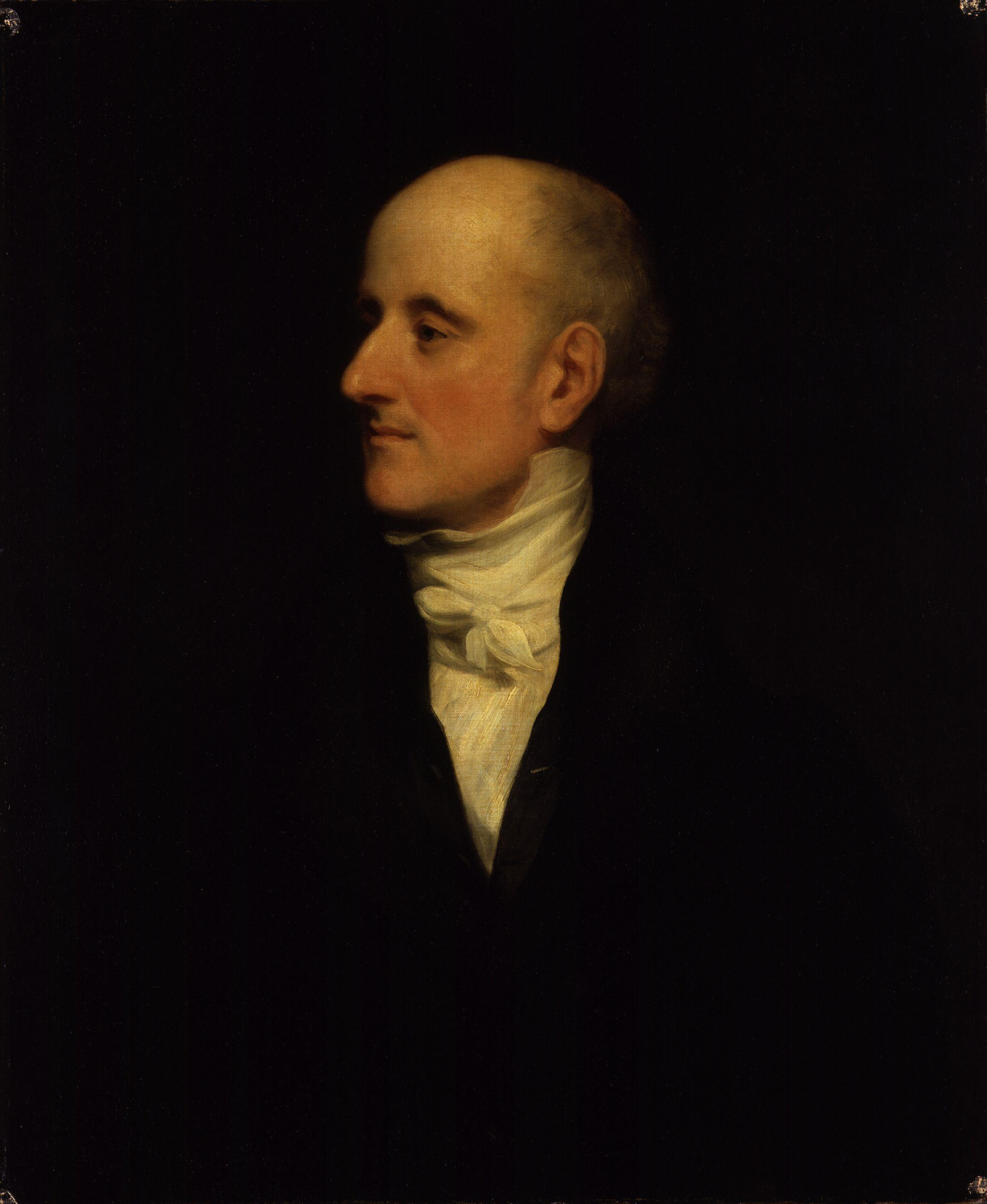
Sir Francis Burdett (here by Thomas Phillips) greatly influenced Hunt

Hunt became a prosperous farmer. He was first drawn into radical politics during the Napoleonic Wars, becoming a supporter of Francis Burdett. His talent for public speaking became noted in the electoral politics of Bristol, where he denounced the complacency of both the Whigs and the Tories, and proclaimed himself a supporter of democratic radicalism. It was thanks to his particular talents that a new programme beyond the narrow politics of the day made steady progress in the difficult years that followed the conclusion of the war with France.

=== Orator ===
After his rousing speeches at mass meetings held in Spa Fields in London in 1816, Hunt became known as the "Orator", a nickname attributed to Robert Southey. He embraced a programme that included annual parliaments and universal suffrage, promoted openly and with none of the conspiratorial element of the old Jacobin clubs. The tactic he most favoured was that of 'mass pressure', which he felt, if given enough weight, could achieve reform without insurrection.

His efforts at mass politics had the effect of radicalising large sections of the community unrepresented in Parliament, although the direct success of these efforts was limited.

=== Peterloo ===
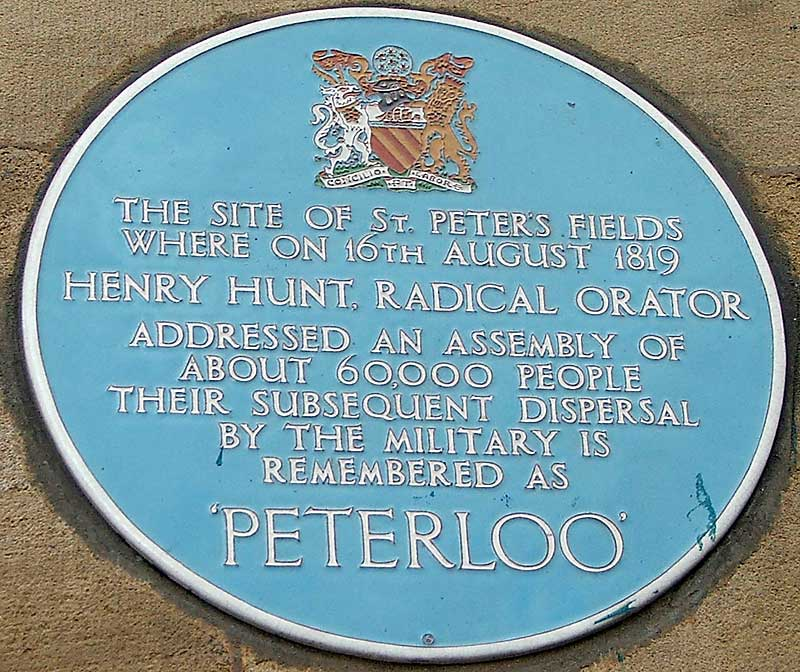
Former blue plaque on Free Trade Hall in Manchester (replaced by red plaque in 2007)

Hunt was invited by the Patriotic Union Society, formed by the Manchester Observer, to be one of the scheduled speakers at a rally in Manchester on 16 August 1819, which turned into the Peterloo massacre. Arrested for high treason and convicted of the lesser charge of seditious conspiracy, he was sentenced to a term of 30 months at Ilchester Gaol. For the establishment, Hunt believed in some concepts that could threaten the profits of the business establishment: equal rights, universal suffrage, parliamentary reform, and an end to child labour.

The debacle at Peterloo, caused by an over-reaction of the local Manchester authorities, added greatly to his prestige. Moral force was not sufficient in itself, and physical force entailed too great a risk. Although urged to do so after Peterloo, Hunt refused to give his approval to schemes for a full-scale insurrection. Thereby momentum was lost, as more desperate souls turned to worn out cloak-and-dagger schemes, which surfaced in the Cato Street conspiracy.

While in prison for his role at Peterloo, Hunt turned to writing to disseminate his message, through a variety of forms including an autobiography. After his release he attempted to recover some of his lost fortune through new business ventures in London, which included the production and marketing of a roasted corn Breakfast Powder, the "most salubrious and nourishing Beverage that can be substituted for the use of Tea and Coffee, which are always exciting, and frequently the most irritating to the Stomach and Bowels." He also made shoe-blacking bottles, which carried the slogan "Equal Laws, Equal Rights, Annual Parliaments, Universal Suffrage, and the Ballot." Synthetic coal, intended specifically for the French market, was another of his schemes. After the July Revolution in 1830 he sent samples to Gilbert du Motier, marquis de La Fayette and other political heroes, along with fraternal greetings.

=== Parliament ===
Business interests notwithstanding, he still found time for practical politics, fighting battles over a whole range of issues, and always pushing for reform and accountability. In 1828 he ran unsuccessfully as a Councilman for the City of London in Farringdon Without on a campaign of investigating how the City's funds were used.

In 1830 he became a member of Parliament for Preston defeating the future British Prime Minister Edward Stanley, but was defeated when standing for re-election in 1832. As a consistent champion of the working classes, a term he used with increasing frequency, he opposed the Whigs, both old and new, and the Reform Act 1832, which he believed did not go far enough in the extension of the franchise. He gave speeches addressed to the "Working Classes and no other", urging them to press for full equal rights. In 1832 he presented the first petition in support of women's suffrage to Parliament. It was received however with much ribald laughter and antagonism. Also in that year, he petitioned parliament on behalf of the radical preacher John Ward, who had been imprisoned for blasphemy.

In his opposition to the Reform Bill, Hunt revived the Great Northern Union, a pressure group he set up some years before, intended to unite the northern industrial workers behind a platform of full democratic reform; and it is in this specifically that his influence on Chartism can be detected.

== Death ==
Hunt's health declined during 1834, and in early 1835 he suffered a severe stroke at Alresford, Hampshire, where he died on 13 February 1835. He was buried at Parham Park, Sussex.

== Legacy ==
A monument to Hunt was erected in 1842 by "the working people", in Every Street, Manchester, in Scholefield's Chapel Yard. A "spiral" march was held on the anniversary of Peterloo, from Piccadilly around the town past the Peterloo site, down to Deansgate and through Ancoats to the monument. The monument's stonework deteriorated, and it was demolished in 1888.

== In popular culture ==
In Mike Leigh's 2018 film Peterloo, Hunt is portrayed by Rory Kinnear.

== See also ==
- Peterloo Massacre

Parliament of the United Kingdom
Preceded by Edward Smith-Stanley; John Wood	Member of Parliament for Preston; 1830–1832; With: John Wood	Succeeded by Peter Hesketh-Fleetwood; Henry Smith-Stanley
