= John Wood (MP for Preston) =

British Whig politician (1789–1856)

John Wood (4 November 1789 – 10 October 1856) was a British Whig politician, MP for Preston 1826–1832.

== Early life ==
Wood was the son of Ottiwell Wood (1759–1847), a Manchester fustian manufacturer and Unitarian, and his wife Grace Grundy. He was baptised at Mosley Street Unitarian Chapel, Manchester, on 19 November 1789.

Intended for the Unitarian ministry, Wood entered the University of Glasgow in 1806, but left without taking a degree in 1808, and went into business in Liverpool. He joined William Corrie, son of Edgar Corrie, who soon went into partnership with his brother Edgar Corrie the younger, and trading as William and Edgar Corrie.

Wood then embarked on a legal career, entering the Inner Temple in 1820, and was called to the bar in 1825, practising as a barrister on the northern circuit.

== Political career ==
Standing for election as a Whig in Preston in 1826, Wood was elected alongside Edward Smith-Stanley (the future Earl of Derby and three-time prime minister), defeating the Radical William Cobbett and the anti-Catholic candidate Robert Smith Barrie.

Wood consistently supported the Whig/Radical opposition, effectively led by Joseph Hume. As a dissenter, he supported religious liberty, advocating repeal of the Test Acts in 1827 and 1828, and supporting Catholic emancipation, which passed as the Roman Catholic Relief Act 1829.

In the 1830 Wood and Smith-Stanley overcame a challenge by the Radical Henry Hunt, but in the by-election following Smith-Stanley's appointment as Chief Secretary for Ireland (in which only Smith-Stanley's seat, not Wood's, was contested), Hunt defeated Smith-Stanley. Wood and Hunt were re-elected unopposed in 1831. Wood stood down at the election of 1832.

== Later career ==
The Corporation of York appointed him Recorder of York in 1832; in 1833, Lord Grey appointed him Chairman of the Board of Stamps and Taxes and he resigned the recordership; he chaired the board through to 1838. (Note: Wood was appointed chairman of the Board of Stamps and of the Board of Taxes in 1833; the following year, the Boards were consolidated into a new Board of Stamps and Taxes, which Wood chaired until 1838.) He was then Chairman of the Board of Excise from 1838 to 1849. In 1849, he was also appointed chair of the Board of Stamps and Taxes again. In 1849, the Board of Excise and the Board of Stamps and Taxes merged into the Board of Inland Revenue, of which Wood was the first chairman, serving until 1856.

He was active in the management of University College London, where he was a member of the council from 1835, and chaired the management committee 1845–1856.

He died in Bath in 1856.

== Family ==
On 9 December 1828, Wood married Elizabeth Serjeantson, daughter of Rev. James Serjeantson, rector of Kirby Knowle, Yorkshire. They had two daughters.

== Notes ==
Parliament of the United Kingdom
Preceded by Edmund Hornby; Samuel Horrocks	Member of Parliament for Preston; 1826–1832; With: Edward Smith-Stanley; Henry Hunt	Succeeded by Peter Hesketh-Fleetwood; Henry Smith-Stanley
Government offices
Preceded by John Thornton	Chairman, Board of Stamps; 1833–1834	Succeeded by Himself (as Chairman, Board of Stamps and Taxes)
Preceded by Robert Mitford	Chairman, Board of Taxes; 1833–1834	Succeeded by Himself (as Chairman, Board of Stamps and Taxes)
Preceded by Himself (as Chairman, Board of Stamps, and Chairman, Board of Taxes)	Chairman, Board of Stamps and Taxes; 1833–1838	Succeeded by Henry Lewis Wickham
Preceded by Sir Francis Doyle Hastings, 1st Baronet	Chairman, Board of Excise; 1838–1849	Succeeded by Himself (as Chairman, Board of Inland Revenue)
Preceded by Henry Lewis Wickham	Chairman, Board of Stamps and Taxes; 1849	Succeeded by Himself (as Chairman, Board of Inland Revenue)
Preceded by Himself (as Chairman, Board of Excise, and Chairman, Board of Stamps and Taxes)	Chairman, Board of Inland Revenue; 1849–1856	Succeeded by Charles Pressly
