= Charles Grenfell (1790–1867) =

British businessman and Liberal Party politician (1790–1867)

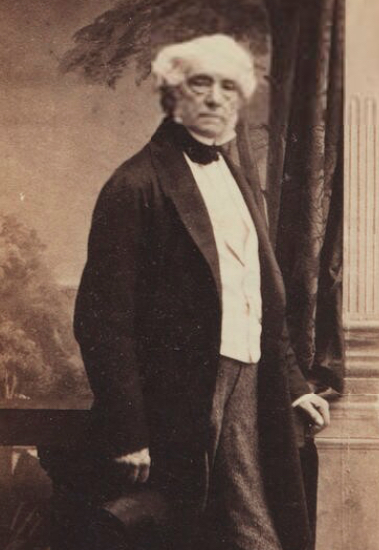
- 1860 photograph of Grenfell by Camille Silvy

Member of Parliament for Preston
- In office 1847–1852 Serving with George Strickland
- Preceded by: Peter Hesketh-Fleetwood; George Strickland
- Succeeded by: George Strickland; Robert Townley Parker

Member of Parliament for Preston
- In office 1857–1865 Serving with: R. A. Cross 1857–1862; Thomas Hesketh 1862–1865
- Preceded by: George Strickland; Robert Townley Parker
- Succeeded by: Thomas Hesketh; Frederick Stanley

Personal details
- Born: 4 April 1790
- Died: 21 March 1867 (aged 76) Taplow, Buckinghamshire, England
- Party: Liberal
- Children: Charles; Henry
- Parent: Pascoe Grenfell (father)

Charles Pascoe Grenfell (4 April 1790 – 21 March 1867) was a British businessman and Liberal Party politician.

== Background ==
Grenfell was the son of the Cornishman Pascoe Grenfell and Charlotte (née Granville). He was a director of the Bank of England from 1830 to 1864. He was also chairman of the board of directors of the London Brighton and South Coast Railway from 1846 to 1848.

== Political career ==
Grenfell was Member of Parliament for Preston from 1847 to 1852, and from 1857 to 1865.

== Family ==
Grenfell married Lady Georgiana Frances, daughter of William Molyneux, 2nd Earl of Sefton, in 1819. They had two sons, Charles Grenfell and Henry Grenfell, and two daughters, Maria Georgiana, who married Frederick Paget, and Louisa Henrietta, who married Theodore Walrond. The family lived at Taplow Court, Taplow, Buckinghamshire.

Lady Georgiana died in June 1826. Grenfell survived her by over 40 years and died at his home, Taplow Court, in March 1867, aged 76.

Parliament of the United Kingdom
Preceded by Sir Peter Hesketh-Fleetwood, Bt; Sir George Strickland, Bt	Member of Parliament for Preston; 1847–1852; With: Sir George Strickland, Bt	Succeeded by Sir George Strickland, Bt; Robert Townley Parker
Preceded by Sir George Strickland, Bt; Robert Townley Parker	Member of Parliament for Preston; 1857–1865; With: R. A. Cross 1857–1862; Sir Thomas Hesketh, Bt 1862–1865	Succeeded by Sir Thomas Hesketh, Bt; Hon. Frederick Stanley
