= Seaforth Barracks =

Barracks in Seaforth, Sefton, England

- Seaforth, Merseyside
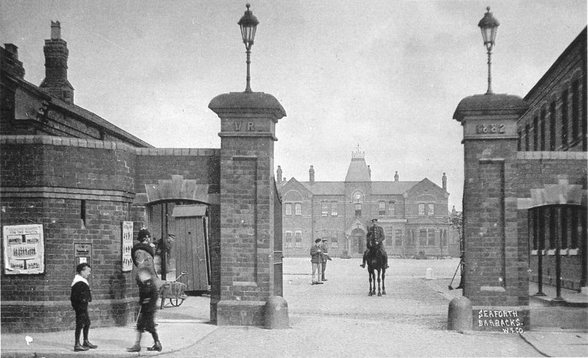
- Seaforth Barracks

Site information
- Type: Barracks
- Operator: British Army

Location
- Location within Merseyside
- Coordinates: 53°28′07″N 03°00′57″W

Site history
- Built: 1882
- Built for: War Office
- In use: 1882-1958

Garrison information
- Occupants: King's Regiment (Liverpool)

Seaforth Barracks was a military installation at Seaforth in Merseyside.

== History ==
The barracks were originally built as cavalry accommodation and were completed in 1882. Units of the Royal Garrison Artillery and Royal Field Artillery were also based there in the late 19th century. The barracks became the depot of the King's Regiment (Liverpool) in 1910 and were a major recruiting centre for Liverpool troops during First World War. The barracks closed and the site was made available for residential development in 1958.
