= November 1882 Preston by-election =

UK parliamentary by-election

- November 25, 1882

Preston constituency
- Turnout: 10,518 (81%)

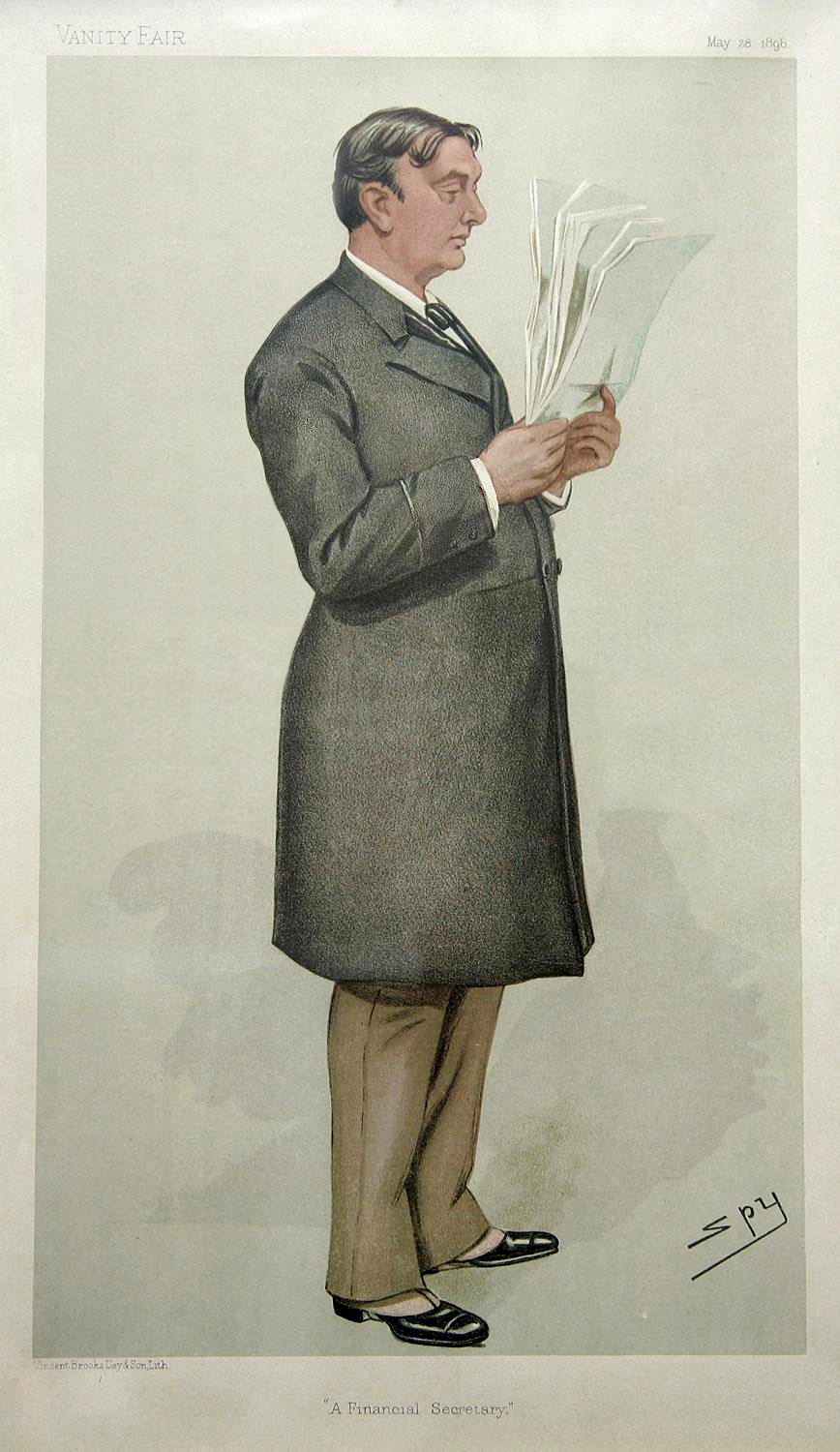
	First party	Second party
Candidate	William Tomlinson	Robert William Hanbury
Party	Conservative	Conservative
Popular vote	6,351	4,167
Percentage	60.4%	39.6%
MP before election
Henry Cecil Raikes
Conservative
Elected MP
William Tomlinson
Conservative

The November 1882 Preston by-election was held on 25 November 1882, following the resignation of the incumbent Conservative MP Henry Cecil Raikes. While multiple candidates stood in the by-election both candidates were members of the Conservative Party. The seat was won by William Tomlinson, although the loser, Robert William Hanbury, would go on to be elected as the second member at the 1885 General Election.

== Result ==
By-election, 25 Nov 1882: Preston (1 seat)
Party	Candidate	Votes	%	±%
Conservative	William Tomlinson	6,351	60.4	N/A
Conservative	Robert William Hanbury	4,167	39.6	N/A
Majority		2,184	20.8	N/A
Turnout		10,518	81.0	−14.8 (est)
Registered electors		12,978		
Conservative hold		Swing	N/A	
