= 1874 Preston by-election =

UK Parliamentary by-election

The 1874 Preston by-election was fought on 24 April 1874. The by-election was fought due to the incumbent Conservative MP, John Holker, becoming Solicitor General for England and Wales. It was retained by the incumbent.
