= Edward Mosley =

Edward Mosley may refer to:

- Edward Mosley (MP for Preston) (died 1638), English lawyer and politician
- Sir Edward Mosley, 2nd Baronet (1639–1665), English politician

== See also ==
- Edward Moseley (1682/83–1749), Surveyor General, later Treasurer, of North Carolina
