= Henry Baird (cricketer) =

Welsh cricketer and British Army officer (1878–1950)

Personal information
- Full name: Henry Hume Chisholm Baird
- Born: 13 April 1878; Haverfordwest, Pembrokeshire, Wales
- Died: 22 February 1950 (aged 71); Sandwich, Kent, England
- Batting: Right-handed
- Bowling: Unknown

Domestic team information
- Years: Team
- 1910–1911/12: Marylebone Cricket Club

Career statistics
| Competition | First-class |
|---|---|
| Matches | 9 |
| Runs scored | 308 |
| Batting average | 19.25 |
| 100s/50s | –/1 |
| Top score | 81 |
| Balls bowled | 920 |
| Wickets | 31 |
| Bowling average | 14.54 |
| 5 wickets in innings | 2 |
| 10 wickets in match | – |
| Best bowling | 5/43 |
| Catches/stumpings | 10/– |
- Source: Cricinfo, 29 January 2019

Henry Hume Chisholm Baird DSO (13 April 1878 – 22 February 1950) was a Welsh cricketer and British Army officer. Entering into the East Kent Regiment from Sandhurst, Baird served in the Second Boer War with distinction, earning the Distinguished Service Order. He later played first-class cricket for the British Army cricket team, the Marylebone Cricket Club, and a combined Army and Navy cricket team.

== Early life and service in the Boer War ==
Born at Haverfordwest to Alexander Baird, he was educated at Cheltenham College. From Cheltenham he attended the Royal Military College, Sandhurst, graduating into the Buffs (East Kent Regiment) as a second lieutenant in September 1897.

He was promoted to the rank of lieutenant in October 1899. Baird served in the Second Boer War, arriving in South Africa as a brigade signalling officer. He was present at the Relief of Kimberley in February 1900, soon after he took part in battle at Paardeberg and Poplar Gove, and the actions that immediately followed at Driefontein. From July to November 1900, he saw action in the Orange River Colony, including engagements at Bothaville and along the Caledon River. He was promoted to the rank of captain in March 1901, at which point Baird was seconded to the Foreign Office beginning in April. His actions during the war saw him mentioned in dispatches, as well as being awarded the Queen's Medal. He was made a Companion of the Distinguished Service Order in September 1901.

== Post-war and first-class cricket ==
Baird stayed in South Africa until after the end of the Second Boer War, and only in November 1902 left Port Natal on the SS Ortona bound for Rangoon, British India.

Baird married Margot Kerr, the daughter of the Preston Member of Parliament John Kerr, in 1905. He was seconded for service as an adjutant for volunteers in April 1905, a post he held until December 1907.

He made his debut in first-class cricket in June 1910, when he was selected to play for the Marylebone Cricket Club (MCC) against Oxford University, he following this up immediately after the match by playing for the MCC against Cambridge University, with both matches played at Lord's. In July 1910, he played a first-class match at Aldershot for a combined Army and Navy cricket team against the combined Oxford and Cambridge Universities cricket team, making his highest first-class score of 81 in this match. He played in the repeat fixture at Portsmouth the following year. Baird toured South America with the MCC in February/March 1902, playing in three first-class matches against Argentina. He later played two first-class matches for the British Army cricket team in against the Royal Navy at Lord's in 1912 and 1913. Playing in nine first-class matches, he scored 308 runs at an average of 19.25, while as a bowler he took 31 wickets at 14.54 runs apiece, with best figures of 5 for 43 against the Royal Navy in 1912.

Baird was seconded to the Royal Military College, Sandhurst in September 1912. He retired from active service as a captain in October 1913.

== World War I and later life ==
With the outbreak of the First World War, Baird rejoined the British Army in August 1914. Ill health caused by the war forced him to retire once more in July 1915. He later became the editor of the Ex-Service Man publication. He died at Sandwich in February 1950.
