= Thomas Ruthall (MP) =

16th-century English politician

Thomas Ruthall was an English politician.

He was a Member (MP) of the Parliament of England for Preston in April 1554, serving with William Berners.
