= Poynter baronets =

Extinct baronetcy in the Baronetage of the United Kingdom

Escutcheon of the Poynter baronets of Albert Gate

The Poynter baronetcy, of Albert Gate in the City of Westminster in the County of London, was a title in the Baronetage of the United Kingdom. It was created on 24 July 1902 for artist Sir Edward Poynter, who was the President of the Royal Academy of Art from 1896 to 1918. The title became extinct on the death of his grandson, the 3rd Baronet, in 1968.

== Poynter baronets, of Albert Gate (1902) ==
- Sir Edward John Poynter, 1st Baronet (1836–1919)
- Sir Ambrose Macdonald Poynter, 2nd Baronet (1867–1923)
- Sir Hugh Edward Poynter, 3rd Baronet (1882–1968)

Baronetage of the United Kingdom
Preceded by Parry baronets	Poynter baronets of Albert Gate; 24 July 1902	Succeeded by Tomlinson baronets
