= William Pooley =

English politician

Sir William Pooley (died 5 August 1629) was an English landowner and politician who sat in the House of Commons at various times between 1621 and 1629.

Pooley was of Boxted, Suffolk and was knighted by James I. In 1621, he was elected Member of Parliament for Preston. He was elected MP for both Preston and Sudbury in 1624 and chose to sit for Sudbury. In 1626 he was elected MP for Wigan. He was elected MP for Sudbury again in 1628 and sat until 1629 when King Charles decided to rule without parliament, and then did so for eleven years.

His daughter Judith married Sir Humphrey May.

Parliament of England
Preceded by Edward Mosley; Henry Banister	Member of Parliament for Preston; 1621–1624; With: Edward Mosley	Succeeded by Edward Mosley; Sir William Hervey
Preceded by Edward Osbourne; Brampton Gurdon	Member of Parliament for Sudbury; 1624; With: Robert Crane	Succeeded by Sir Nathaniel Barnardiston; Robert Crane
Preceded by Francis Downes; Edward Bridgeman	Member of Parliament for Wigan; 1626; With: Sir Anthony St John	Succeeded by Edward Bridgeman; Sir Anthony St John
Preceded by Thomas Smith; Sir Nathaniel Barnardiston	Member of Parliament for Sudbury; 1628–1629; With: Robert Crane	Parliament suspended until 1640
