= James Hodge (politician) =

British politician

- Born: 13 December 1879
- Died: 12 July 1946 (aged 66)
- Occupation: Politician

James Philip Hodge (13 December 1879 – 12 July 1946) was a British Liberal politician and lawyer.

== Family & education ==
Hodge was the son of Archibald Hodge of Hoole Park, Chester who had been miner in Fife. He was educated at the former Chester Cathedral Choir School. The school closed in 1975. He qualified as a chartered accountant and practised in Chester from the age of 21 but he relinquished this profession in favour of the law and was called to the bar at the Inner Temple in 1917 and practiced law on the Northern Circuit. In the same year he married Anna Fortunée the daughter of Michel Venture a shipowner from Marseille. They had a daughter and a son. His wife died in 1944.

== Military service ==
Before the First World War Hodge served as a private in the Inns of Court Officers' Training Corps. He later obtained a commission in the Army Pay Department and went to France in 1914. He also served in Salonika and Egypt. He was subsequently appointed Inspector of Pay Offices with the rank of Lieutenant-Colonel.

== Politics ==
Hodge was Liberal MP for Preston from 1922 to 1924. Preston was a two-member seat at that time. In the 1922 general election the Labour candidate topped the poll, with Hodge taking the second seat from the sitting Conservative member, George Frederick Stanley.

At the general election of 1923, each of the political parties decided to stand only one candidate. The Tories thought seriously about putting up two candidates in the two member constituency on the grounds that this would have split the anti-Tory vote for the second seat and would have strongly discouraged their supporters from using the second vote for a Liberal or Labour candidate. In the event, Hodge held his seat.

1923-24 saw the arrival of the first Labour government under Prime Minister Ramsay MacDonald. The Conservatives had won the most seats but had lost their overall majority. The general election produced a hung parliament and Labour took office as a minority administration with the support of the Liberals. However their position was precarious and although the Liberals were desperate to avoid a third general election in three years, it was Liberal action in Parliament which started the process which led the downfall of the government. Hodge, however, was one of 12 rebel Liberals who supported the government in the crucial parliamentary vote of October 1924 which in effect brought about the end of the first Labour government. It was not enough to ensure he held his seat however as he lost at Preston at the 1924 general election, his seat being taken by a Conservative. At first he remained as Liberal parliamentary candidate for Preston but gave up citing ill health in 1927. However he seems to have been well enough to carry on his legal practice at least until 1929.

== Outside Parliament ==
Hodge took part in sculling, played golf and took a strong interest in Theology.

== Sources ==
- Who was Who, OUP 2007
- Obituary - The Times, 15 July 1946
- See also List of Liberal Party (UK) MPs

Parliament of the United Kingdom
Preceded by George Frederick Stanley; Tom Shaw	Member of Parliament for Preston; 1922 – 1924; With: Tom Shaw	Succeeded by Alfred Ravenscroft Kennedy; Tom Shaw
