= William Hervey (politician, born 1586) =

English politician (1586 - 1660)

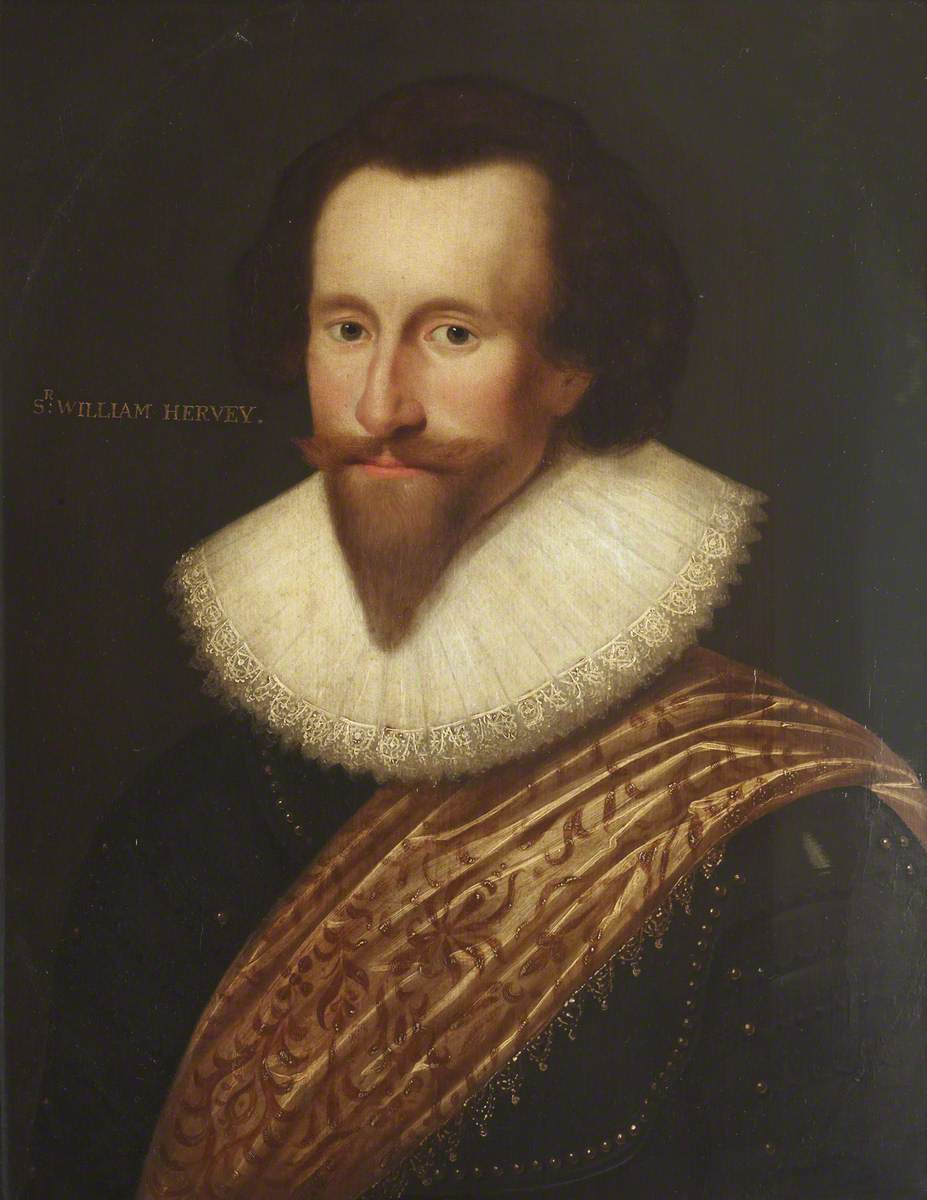
Sir William Hervey, MP

Sir William Hervey (1586 – 30 September 1660) was an English politician who sat in the House of Commons at various times between 1624 and 1629.

Hervey was the son of John Hervey of Ickworth, Suffolk and Frances Bocking. He was knighted at Whitehall on 29 April 1608, as of St Martins. In 1624, he was elected Member of Parliament for Preston in the Happy Parliament. He was re-elected MP for Preston in 1625. In 1628 he was elected MP for Bury St Edmunds and sat until 1629 when King Charles I decided to rule without parliament for eleven years.

Hervey married as his first wife Susan Jermyn, daughter of Sir Robert Jermyn of Rushbrooke and Judith Blagge. They had two sons, John and Thomas, and several daughters, including Mary, who married Sir Edward Gage, 1st Baronet. After Susan's death, Hervey married Gage's twice-widowed mother Penelope Darcy, daughter of Thomas Darcy, 1st Earl Rivers and Mary Kitson; she was a noted recusant. His grandson John Hervey was created Baron Hervey, of Ickworth, in 1703, and Earl of Bristol in 1714.

Hervey died at the age of about 74.

Parliament of England
Preceded by Edward Mosley; Sir William Pooley	Member of Parliament for Preston; 1624–1625; With: Edward Mosley; Henry Banister	Succeeded by George Gerard; Thomas Fanshawe
Preceded by Thomas Jermyn; Emanuel Gifford	Member of Parliament for Bury St Edmunds; 1628–1629; With: Thomas Jermyn	Parliament suspended until 1640
