= John Thomas Macpherson =

John Thomas Macpherson (1872–1921) was a Labour Member of Parliament for the United Kingdom House of Commons constituency of Preston.

A one-time cabin boy, steel smelter and founder of the Steel Smelters' Society he was elected to represent Preston at the United Kingdom general election of 1906. His first recorded question in the House of Commons concerned the wages of armour-plate makers.

At the time of the 1910 Rotherham by-election, Macpherson was an official of the British Steel Smelters, Mill, Iron and Tin-plate Workers’ Union and the union was said to be strong in the Rotherham constituency and willing to pay for his deposit and other expenses to stand in the election.

Parliament of the United Kingdom
Preceded by John Kerr; Sir William Tomlinson, Bt	Member of Parliament for Preston; 1906 – 1910; With: Harold Cox	Succeeded by George Stanley; Alfred Tobin
Trade union offices
Preceded by New position	Assistant General Secretary of the British Steel Smelters' Association; 1900 – 1906	Succeeded by Arthur Pugh
