= Harold Cox =

British politician (1859–1936)

Harold Cox

Harold Cox (1859 – 1 May 1936) was a Liberal MP for Preston from 1906 to 1910.

== Early life ==
The son of Homersham Cox, a County Court judge, Cox was educated at Tonbridge School in Kent and was scholar and later fellow at Jesus College, Cambridge, where he took a Mathematics degree in 1882. He later lectured on Political Economy for the Cambridge University Extension Society in York and Hull.

Edward Carpenter told some of Harold's story, and acknowledged his part in providing Edward with comfortable footwear:

DURING my absence in the United States, my friend Harold Cox, who had just left Cambridge, came down to Millthorpe and spent a good part of the summer there - remaining a bit after my return home. He wanted to get manual and farm and garden experience, and that same autumn he plunged into farming - took a farm at Tilford in Surrey, and inducted a little colony into it. But the land was mere sand, and the experience of one winter and spring was enough! In less than a year he gave the place up, and went out, by way of a change, to India, to the Anglo-Mohammedan College at Futtehgur. While in India he went in '85 or '86 for a tour in Cashmere, and from Cashmere he sent me a pair of Indian sandals.

Harold taught mathematics for two years in India at the Muhammadan Anglo-Oriental College, which is now Aligarh Muslim University at Aligarh. He returned to England in 1887 to read for the Bar, and became a student of Gray's Inn. Instead of a barrister, he became a journalist.

In 1890, he married Helen Clegg, a successful accountant and auditor.

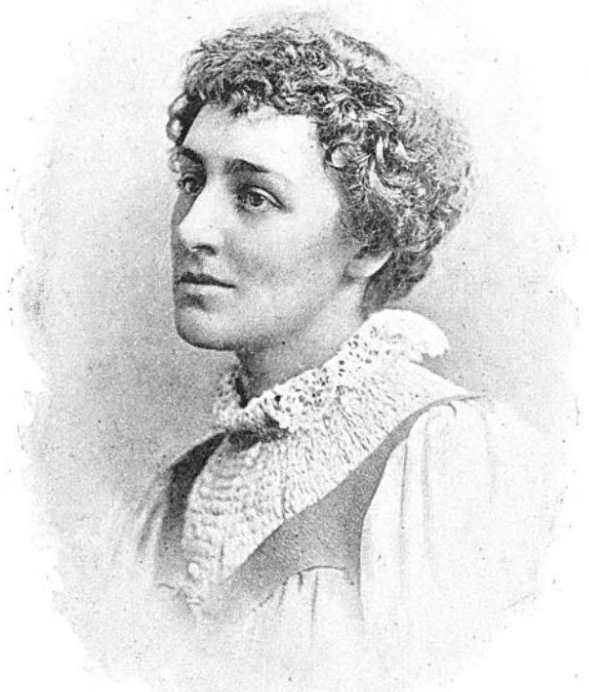
Helen Cox, née Clegg

As a proponent of free trade, he was secretary of the Cobden Club from 1899 to 1904. Cox was elected as a Liberal Member of Parliament for Preston in the general election of 1906, where he campaigned vigorously against the Unionist's proposals for Tariff Reform.

== Member of Parliament ==
However his tenure as a Liberal MP was not a happy one; Cox was a classical liberal but the Liberal Party was moving away from this to embrace new liberalism during the passage of the Liberal welfare reforms. Cox, almost alone in the Liberal Party, fought against his party's policies of old-age pensions, meals for poor schoolchildren and unemployment benefit. He exclaimed in his Socialism in the House of Commons (1907) that he was against weakening individual and group responsibility. G. P. Gooch, a Liberal MP in support of such reforms, said that Cox "was the only man on the Liberal side who clung to the doctrines of laissez-faire in their unadulterated form. While we saw in the state an indispensable instrument for establishing a minimum standard of life for the common man, he dreaded the slackening of moral fibre as a result of getting 'something for nothing'."

In the general election of January 1910, Cox sought re-election as a free trade candidate in opposition to the official Liberal candidate, Sir John Gorst but came bottom of the poll. He stood as a free trade candidate at the Cambridge by-election in 1911 but failed to win the seat. He was subsequently Alderman of the London County Council from 1910 to 1912 and then editor of the Edinburgh Review to 1929.

Cox also served on a number of committees: the Bryce Commission on German Outrages in 1915, the Committee on Public Retrenchment in 1916 and the Royal Commission on Decimal Currency in 1919.

== Stamp's Law of Statistics ==
Cox originated the citation which subsequently became known as "Stamp's Law of Statistics": "The individual source of the statistics may easily be the weakest link. Harold Cox tells a story of his life as a young man in India. He quoted some statistics to a Judge, an Englishman, and a very good fellow. His friend said, 'Cox, when you are a bit older, you will not quote Indian statistics with that assurance. The Government are very keen on amassing statistics – they collect them, add them, raise them to the nth power, take the cube root and prepare wonderful diagrams. But what you must never forget is that every one of these figures comes in the first place from the chowky dar [village watchman], who just puts down what he damn pleases.'"

== Legacy ==
The Labour politician Philip Snowden said of Cox: "There has been no member of the House of Commons in my time quite like Mr. Harold Cox. Mr. Asquith once said of him that he was the sort of man for whom a special constituency ought to be provided to keep him in the House of Commons. He was almost the sole survivor of the old Manchester School. Mr. Cox was a very polished speaker, and stated the case with which he was dealing with great intellectual force...[he was an] incorrigible individualist".

In an obituary for The Economic Journal, Charles Mallet wrote:

Many friends still hold in honour and affection Harold Cox’s fearless independence, fine character, unworldly life, and the ideals which he held with such staunch tenacity and expressed with so much gallantry, urbanity and grace.

== Publications ==
The following works of Harold Cox are available through Internet Archive:

- 1891: (with Sidney Webb) The Eight Hours Day
- 1902: The United Kingdom and its Trade
- 1902: The Colonies and the Corn Tax
- 1903: (with Ernest Edwin Williams) Free Trade v. Protection
- 1903: Mr. Balfour’s Pamphlet: A Reply
- 1904: (editor) British Industries under Free Trade
- 1906: Land Nationalization and Land Taxation
- 1911: Introduction to The Development of the Telephone in Europe by Herbert Laws Webb
- 1914: The Economic Strength of Great Britain
- 1920: Economic Liberty
- 1922: The Problem of Population
- The Public Debt of Great Britain, North American Review volume 173
- The Public Debts of the British Possessions, North American Review volume 174

== Notes ==
Parliament of the United Kingdom
Preceded by John Kerr; Sir William Tomlinson, Bt	Member of Parliament for Preston; 1906 – January 1910; With: John Thomas Macpherson	Succeeded by George Stanley; Alfred Tobin
