= Henry Cecil Raikes =

British politician (1838–1891)

The Right Honourable Henry Cecil Raikes
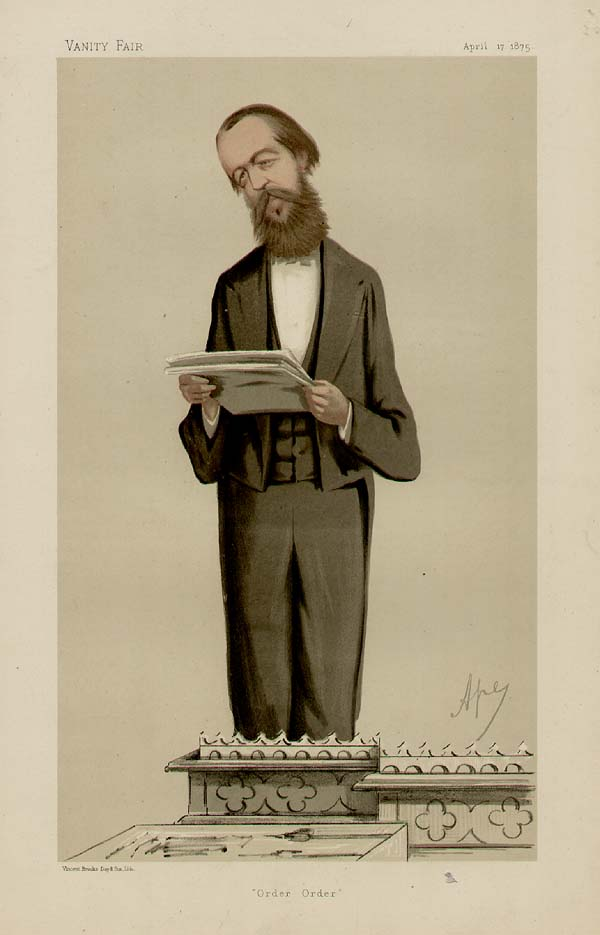
- "Order, order" Raikes as caricatured by Ape (Carlo Pellegrini) in Vanity Fair, 17 April 1875

Deputy Speaker of the House of Commons Chairman of Ways and Means
- In office 1874–1880
- Speaker: Henry Brand
- Preceded by: John Bonham-Carter
- Succeeded by: Lyon Playfair

Postmaster General
- In office 19 August 1886 – 24 August 1891
- Monarch: Victoria
- Prime Minister: The Marquess of Salisbury
- Preceded by: The Lord Wolverton
- Succeeded by: Sir James Fergusson, Bt

Personal details
- Born: 18 November 1838 Chester, Cheshire
- Died: 24 August 1891 (aged 52) Denbighshire
- Party: Conservative
- Spouse(s): Charlotte Trevor-Roper (d. 1922)
- Education: Trinity College, Cambridge

Henry Cecil Raikes PC (18 November 1838 – 24 August 1891) was a British Conservative Party politician. He was Chairman of Ways and Means between 1874 and 1880 and served as Postmaster General between 1886 and 1891.

== Background and education ==
Born in Chester, Cheshire, Raikes was the grandson of Reverend Henry Raikes, Chancellor of the Diocese of Chester, and the great-grandson of Thomas Raikes, a merchant and banker in London, who was Governor of the Bank of England and a personal friend of prime minister William Pitt the Younger. He was educated at Shrewsbury School and Trinity College, Cambridge.

== Political career ==
Raikes was Member of Parliament for Chester between 1868 and 1880, for Preston in 1882 and for Cambridge University between 1882 and 1891. He served as Chairman of the National Union of Conservative and Constitutional Associations from 1869 to 1874. In 1874 he was appointed Chairman of Ways and Means (Deputy Speaker of the House of Commons), a post he held until 1880, when he was sworn of the Privy Council. He later returned to party political life when he served as Postmaster General under Lord Salisbury between 1886 and 1891.

Raikes is one of the earliest British politicians to have had their voice recorded. George Edward Gouraud recorded him on behalf of Thomas Edison on the evening of 5 October 1888 at his home in Upper Sydenham near Crystal Palace, London.

== Family ==
Raikes married Charlotte Blanche, of Plas Teg, Mold, daughter of Charles Blayney Trevor-Roper, on 26 September 1861. They had several children, including Cecil Dacre Staveley Raikes (1874–1947), a Vice-Admiral in the Royal Navy, and Henry St John Digby Raikes, father of the Conservative politician Sir Victor Raikes. The family lived at Llwynegrin Hall, Wales. Raikes died on 24 August 1891, aged 52. Charlotte Raikes survived her husband by over 30 years and died in September 1922.

Parliament of the United Kingdom
Preceded by Earl Grosvenor; William Henry Gladstone	Member of Parliament for Chester; 1868–1880; With: Earl Grosvenor 1868–1869; Norman Grosvenor 1869–1874; John George Dodson 1874–1880; Hon. Beilby Lawley	Constituency suspended
Preceded by Sir John Holker; William Farrer Ecroyd	Member of Parliament for Preston; February 1882 – November 1882; With: William Farrer Ecroyd	Succeeded by William Farrer Ecroyd; William Tomlinson
Preceded by Spencer Horatio Walpole; Alexander Beresford Hope	Member of Parliament for Cambridge University; 1882–1891; With: Alexander Beresford Hope 1882–1887; Sir George Stokes, Bt 1887–1891	Succeeded by Sir George Stokes, Bt; Sir Richard Claverhouse Jebb
Party political offices
Preceded by Viscount Holmesdale	Chairman of the National Union of Conservative and Constitutional Associations; 1869 – 1874	Succeeded by Viscount Mahon
Preceded by John Bonham-Carter	Chairman of Ways and Means; 1874–1880	Succeeded by Lyon Playfair
Political offices
Preceded by The Lord Wolverton	Postmaster General; 1886–1891	Succeeded by Sir James Fergusson, Bt
