= 1903 Preston by-election =

UK parliamentary by-election

- May 14, 1903

Preston constituency
- Turnout: 15,129 (84.2%)
| | First party | Second party |
|---|---|---|
| Candidate | John Kerr | John Hodge |
| Party | Conservative | Labour Repr. Cmte. |
| Popular vote | 8,639 | 6,490 |
| Percentage | 57.1% | 42.9% |
MP before election
Robert William Hanbury
Conservative
Elected MP
John Kerr
Conservative

The 1903 Preston by-election was held on 14 May 1903, following the death of the incumbent Conservative MP Robert William Hanbury. The by-election was won by the Conservative candidate John Kerr. This was despite the support lent by the Liberal Party and local temperance movements to John Hodge the Labour candidate.

== Result ==
1903 Preston by-election
| Party | Candidate | Votes | % | ±% |
|---|---|---|---|---|
| Conservative | John Kerr | 8,639 | 57.1 | −20.8 |
| Labour Repr. Cmte. | John Hodge | 6,490 | 42.9 | +20.8 |
| Majority | | 2,149 | 14.2 | −0.6 |
| Turnout | | 15,129 | 84.2 | +7.8 |
| Registered electors | | 17,973 | | |
| Conservative hold | | Swing | −20.8 | |
