= Alfred Tobin =

British lawyer and judge

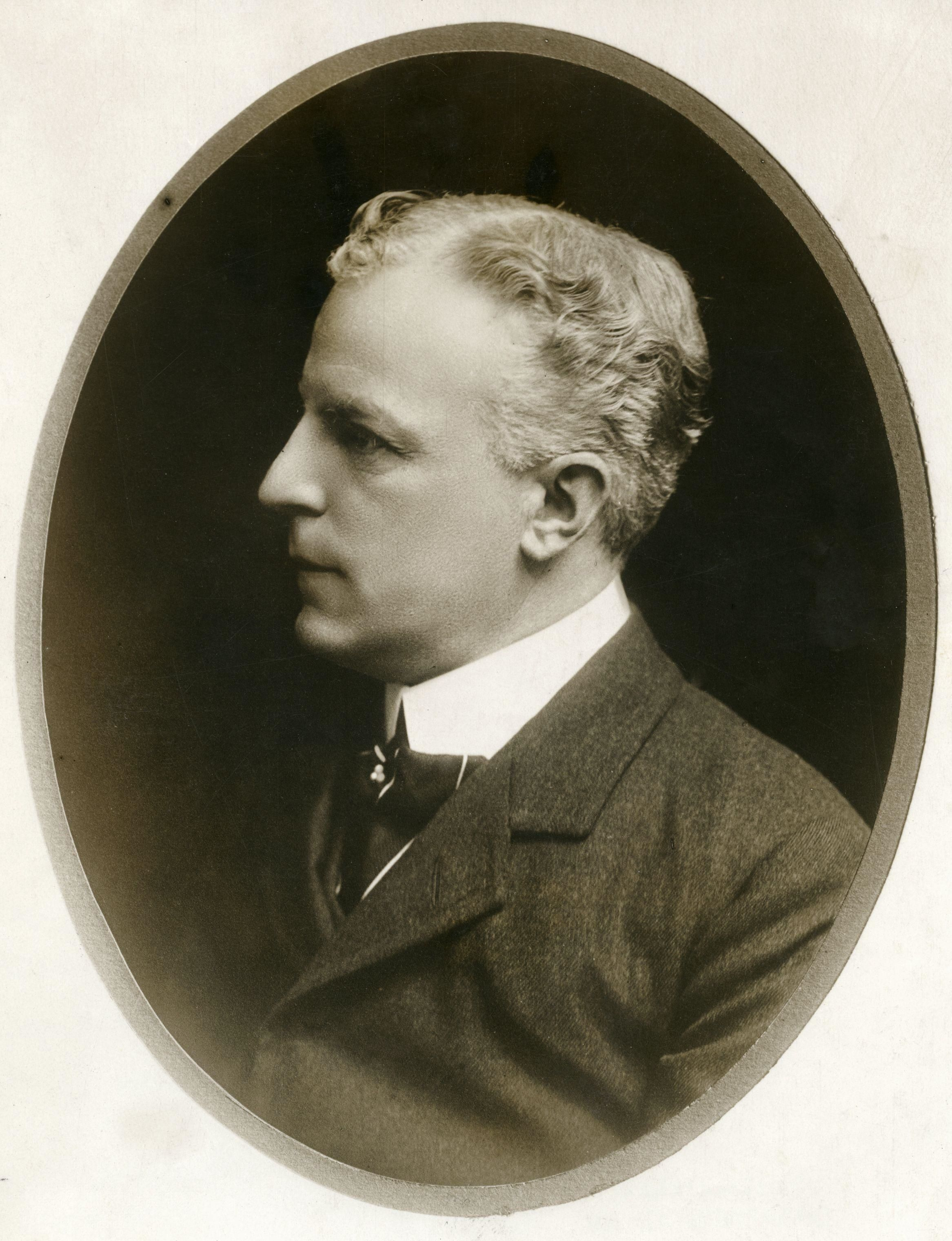
Alfred Tobin (1910)

Sir Alfred Aspinall Tobin (26 December 1855 – 30 November 1939) was a British lawyer and judge who served as the Conservative Member of Parliament for Preston between 1910 and 1915.

== Biography ==
Tobin's grandfather, Thomas Tobin, had been a prominent Liverpool merchant; his son, James Aspinall Tobin, followed him into the same line of business and rose to become the Mayor of Liverpool in 1854–55. Alfred Tobin was educated at Rugby School, where he took prizes in Greek or Latin, and then at University College, Oxford, where he took first-class honours in law and history.

He then trained as a barrister at Middle Temple, where he was called to the bar in 1880 and devilled for William Rann Kennedy. He was appointed a King's Counsel in 1903. His most prominent cases were in a series of major lawsuits following the 1907 Kingston earthquake, where he was leading counsel for a group of insurers, and as the defence barrister in the 1910 trial of Dr. Crippen. He was appointed as Recorder of Salford in 1904, where he was noted as a conscientious judge, particularly when dealing with young offenders and inexperienced barristers.

He unsuccessfully contested the Liverpool Scotland seat in the 1906 general election, and was elected as the Conservative candidate at Preston in the general election of January 1910, then re-elected in December that year. His maiden speech was in March 1910, when he spoke about Preston's denominational schools in a debate on Training Colleges.

He was appointed a Judge of the County Courts for Herefordshire and Shropshire in 1915, causing his resignation from Parliament and a subsequent by-election in Preston. In 1919 he transferred to the Westminster County Court, from where he retired in 1935, aged eighty.

In his private life, he was a keen traveller, particularly in Italy, Greece, and Palestine, where he was once captured and ransomed while travelling in the Transjordan. He was also an active freemason, and master of two Lodges.

Parliament of the United Kingdom
Preceded by Harold Cox; John Thomas Macpherson	Member of Parliament for Preston; January 1910 – 1915; With: George Stanley	Succeeded by George Stanley; Urban H. Broughton
