= Alfred Ravenscroft Kennedy =

British politician & judge (1879–1943)

Alfred Ravenscroft Kennedy (February 1879 – 10 February 1943) was a Conservative member of parliament for the United Kingdom House of Commons constituency of Preston who later became a County Court judge.

During his time in Parliament he asked if a Bill supporting rural properties could be introduced. He studied at Eton College and Cambridge University (where he was secretary and manager of the Liberal Club). He was called to the Bar in 1903.

He was employed as a legal adviser to the Foreign and Commonwealth Office.

Parliament of the United Kingdom
Preceded by James Philip Hodge; Tom Shaw	Member of Parliament for Preston; 1924–1929; With: Tom Shaw	Succeeded by William Jowitt; Tom Shaw
