= John Kerr (British politician) =

British businessman and a Conservative Party politician (1852-1925)

John Kerr (1852-1925) was a British businessman and a Conservative Party politician. He was the Member of Parliament (MP) for Preston in Lancashire from 1903 to 1906.

Kerr, who lived in East Lothian, was the principal owner of Dick, Kerr, and Company Ltd, which gained large contracts for the construction of tram and cable lines in London, Edinburgh and other cities.

He unsuccessfully contested the 1900 general election in his home area of Haddingtonshire. In April 1903, Robert William Hanbury, the Conservative MP for Preston, died aged 58. In the preceding years, Kerr's company had opened extensive tram and electrical equipment factories in Preston, employing nearly 2,000 people, and he was selected as the Conservative candidate for the by-election in May 1903. The Times newspaper reported that he described himself as a firm supporter of the government and as "a thorough Imperialist, believing the maintenance of the Empire as a whole to be essential to the prosperity, if not continued existence, of Britain as an independent Power". The Liberal Party backed the Labour candidate, trade unionist John Hodge, who had the support of the local temperance movement and reported the defection of many local working-class Conservatives to the Labour cause. However, Kerr won the seat with a majority of 14% of the votes over Hodge, his sole opponent.

Kerr held the Preston seat until his defeat at the 1906 general election, after which he did not stand for Parliament again.

His daughter, Margot, married the British Army officer and first-class cricketer Henry Baird in 1905.

Parliament of the United Kingdom
| Preceded by Robert William Hanbury; William Tomlinson | Member of Parliament for Preston; 1903–1906; With: William Tomlinson | Succeeded by John Thomas Macpherson; Harold Cox |
