= February 1882 Preston by-election =

UK parliamentary by-election

- February 2, 1882

Preston constituency
- Turnout: 10,257 (79%)
	First party	Second party
Candidate	Henry Cecil Raikes	William Simpson
Party	Conservative	Lib-Lab
Popular vote	6,045	4,212
Percentage	58.9%	41.1%
MP before election
John Holker
Conservative
Elected MP
Henry Cecil Raikes
Conservative

The February 1882 Preston by-election was held on 2 February 1882, following the resignation of the incumbent Conservative MP John Holker, after his appointment as Lord Justice of Appeal. The seat was won by the Conservative candidate, Henry Cecil Raikes.

== Result ==
By-election, 4 Feb 1882: Preston (1 seat)
Party	Candidate	Votes	%	±%
Conservative	Henry Cecil Raikes	6,045	58.9	−10.0
Lib-Lab	William Simpson	4,212	41.1	+10.0
Majority		1,833	17.8	+16.2
Turnout		10,257	79.0	−16.8 (est)
Registered electors		12,978		
Conservative hold		Swing	−10.0	
