= Henry Banister (politician) =

English politician (1538–1628)

Henry Banister (c. 1538–1628) was an English politician who sat in the House of Commons in 1614 and in 1625.

Banister was a goldsmith living in Clapton, Hackney. In 1614, he was elected Member of Parliament for Preston in the Addled Parliament. He was an out-burgess of Preston in 1624. In 1625 he was elected MP for Preston again.

Banister died at the age of about 90.

Banister had a son Christopher and two daughters.

His widow Anne (d. 1634) married Sir William Bulstrode in 1629, Member of Parliament for Rutland.

Parliament of England
Preceded by Sir Vincent Skinner; William Holt	Member of Parliament for Preston; 1614; With: Edward Mosley	Succeeded by Edward Mosley; Sir William Pooley
Preceded by Edward Mosley; Sir William Hervey	Member of Parliament for Preston; 1625; With: Sir William Hervey	Succeeded by George Gerard; Thomas Fanshawe
