= George Stanley (British politician) =

British politician

Lieutenant-Colonel The Right Honourable Sir George Frederick Stanley GCSI GCIE CMG

Governor of Madras
- In office 11 November 1929 – 16 May 1934
- Preceded by: Sir Norman Marjoribanks (acting)
- Succeeded by: Mohammad Usman of Madras (acting)
- In office 15 August 1934 – 16 November 1934
- Preceded by: Mohammad Usman of Madras (acting)
- Succeeded by: John Erskine, Lord Erskine

Personal details
- Born: 14 October 1872
- Died: 1 July 1938 (aged 65) United Kingdom
- Party: Conservative
- Spouse: Lady Beatrix Taylour
- Parent(s): Frederick Stanley, 16th Earl of Derby; Lady Constance Villiers

Sir George Frederick Stanley GCSI GCIE CMG (14 October 1872 – 1 July 1938) was a British soldier and Conservative Party politician who served as a member of the UK Parliament for Preston and, later, Willesden East. He also served as the Governor of Madras from 1929 to 1934 and as Acting Viceroy of India in 1934.

== Life ==
The sixth son of Frederick Stanley, 16th Earl of Derby, Stanley was educated at Wellington College and at the Royal Military Academy, Woolwich. In 1903, he married Lady Beatrix Taylour, the youngest daughter of the 3rd Marquess of Headfort. He was the grandson of Edward Smith-Stanley, the former British Prime Minister.

He entered the Royal Horse Artillery in 1893 and was promoted to captain in 1900. He served in the Second Boer War in 1899–1900 and was Adjutant with the Honourable Artillery Company from 1904 to 1909. He later served in World War I and was mentioned in despatches and awarded the CMG in the 1916 Birthday Honours for his military service.

He was Conservative Member of Parliament for Preston from 1910 to 1922 and for Willesden East from 1924 to 1929.

He held office as Comptroller of the Household from 1919 until 1921, as Financial Secretary to the War Office from 1921 to 1922, Parliamentary Under-Secretary of State for the Home Department from 1922 to 1923, Parliamentary Secretary to the Ministry of Pensions from 1924 to 1929. Furthermore, he was Governor of Madras from 1929 to 1934.

He was appointed a Privy Counsellor in the 1927 Birthday Honours and made a Knight Grand Commander of the Order of the Indian Empire (GCIE) in 1929,a Knight Grand Commander of the Order of the Star of India in the 1934 Birthday Honours.

== As Governor of Madras ==
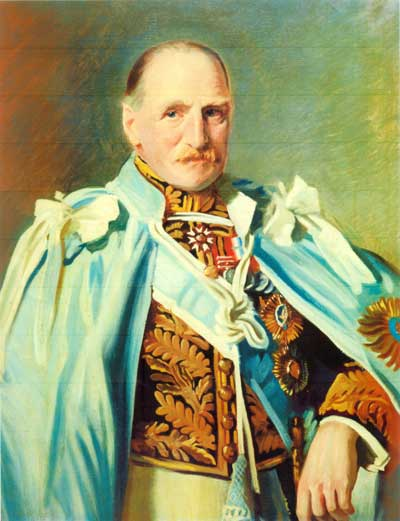
Portrait by Oswald Birley

Stanley was appointed Governor of Madras on 26 October 1929 at an annual salary of ₹ 1,20,000. He arrived in India and took over as governor on 12 November 1929.

Stanley assumed the governorate at a critical juncture. The Great Depression had just begun, and the economy was deteriorating. The Premier P. Subbarayan resigned after the 1930 elections when his party was voted out. The Swaraj Party boycotted the elections as a part of the Civil Disobedience Movement and the Justice Party was voted to power in the 1930 and 1934 elections. B. Munuswamy Naidu served as Premier from 1930 to 1932, but he had to resign in 1932 due to the strong opposition of landowning elements in the party. Naidu was succeeded by Ramakrishna Ranga Rao of Bobbili whose administration soon became notorious for mis-governance.

During his tenure as governor, Stanley was responsible for implementing the Mettur Dam across the Kaveri River. The project's inauguration, on 21 August 1934, was attended by people from all parts of the Presidency. The reservoir created by the Dam was named Stanley Reservoir in his honour. On 17 January 1930, Stanley laid the foundation stone of a Gaudiya Math and a temple at Royapettah, Madras. The first service of the Madras suburban line of the South Indian Railway Company was flagged off by Stanley from Chennai Beach railway station on 2 April 1931. In 1933, Stanley inaugurated the five-year medicine and surgery diploma course at the Royapuram Medical College. On 2 July 1938, the school was renamed Stanley Medical College in his honour. In 1931, he had received Ignatius Elias III, the Patriarch of Antioch, on his way to Malankara.

== Commemoration ==
The Government Stanley Medical College in Chennai (Madras), Tamil Nadu, India is named in memory of Stanley. The Diploma in Medicine and Surgery program was inaugurated here in 1933 by Stanley when he was the Governor of Madras. The college formerly known as Royapuram Medical School was renamed Stanley Medical School on 27 March 1934 in his honour. It was renamed to Stanley Medical College in 1938.

== Family ==
Married Lady Beatrix Taylour born: 6 January 1877 – 3 May 1944; together they had a daughter, Barbara Helen Stanley (1906-1986)

== Notes ==
Parliament of the United Kingdom
Preceded by John Thomas Macpherson; Harold Cox	Member of Parliament for Preston; January 1910 – 1922; With: Alfred Tobin 1910–1915; Urban H. Broughton 1915–1918; Tom Shaw 1918–1922	Succeeded by James Philip Hodge; Tom Shaw
Preceded by Harcourt Johnstone	Member of Parliament for Willesden East; 1924–1929	Succeeded by Daniel Somerville
Political offices
Preceded by Sir Edwin Cornwall	Comptroller of the Household; 1919–1921	Succeeded by Harry Barnston
Preceded by Sir Norman Marjoribanks	Governor of Madras; 11 November 1929 – 16 May 1934	Succeeded by Mohammad Usman of Madras
