= Edward Hermon =

British cotton magnate and Conservative Party politician

Edward Hermon (2 April 1822 – 6 May 1881) was a British cotton magnate and Conservative Party politician.

At the 1868 general election he was elected on his first attempt a Member of Parliament (MP) for the two-seat constituency of Preston in Lancashire. He was re-elected in the 1874 and in 1880 general elections, and held the seat until he died in office in 1881, aged 59. The resulting by-election in Preston was held on 23 May 1881, and won by the Conservative candidate William Ecroyd.

Hermon's last recorded contribution to debates in the House of Commons was eight days before his death, aged 59, on 28 April 1881, when he asked Prime Minister Gladstone a sceptical question about the proposed commercial treaty with France.

== Family ==
In 1872–78 Hermon had Wyfold Court built at Rotherfield Peppard near Henley-on-Thames in Oxfordshire. It is an elaborate Gothic Revival country house designed by the architect Somers Clarke.

Hermon's only daughter was Frances Caroline Hermon (died 1929), who was married in 1877 to Robert Trotter Hodge (1851–1937), who later became MP for Accrington and other constituencies. After being made a baronet in 1902, Hodge changed his surname to Hermon-Hodge in honour of his wife's family, and was later ennobled as Baron Wyfold.

Parliament of the United Kingdom
Preceded by Hon. Frederick Stanley and Sir Thomas Hesketh	Member of Parliament for Preston; 1868 – 1881; With: Sir Thomas Hesketh to 1872; John Holker from 1872	Succeeded by William Ecroyd; John Holker
