= Sir Thomas Fermor-Hesketh, 5th Baronet =

English Conservative politician

Sir Thomas Fermor-Hesketh Bt DL JP MP

Member of Parliament for Preston
- In office 1862–1872 Serving with Charles Grenfell, Frederick Stanley, Edward Hermon
- Preceded by: R. A. Cross; Charles Grenfell
- Succeeded by: Edward Hermon; John Holker

Personal details
- Born: Thomas George Hesketh; 11 January 1825 Rufford Hall, Rufford, Lancashire
- Died: 20 August 1872 (aged 47) Rufford Hall, Rufford, Lancashire
- Party: Conservative
- Spouse: Lady Arabella Fermor (m. 1846)
- Children: 4, including Thomas
- Parent(s): Sir Thomas Hesketh, 4th Baronet; Annette Maria Bomford
- Education: Christ Church, Oxford

Sir Thomas George Fermor-Hesketh, 5th Baronet DL JP MP(11 January 1825 – 20 August 1872) was an English Conservative politician who sat in the House of Commons from 1862 to 1872.

== Early life ==
Hesketh was the only son of Sir Thomas Hesketh, 4th Baronet and his wife Annette Maria Bomford daughter of Robert Bomford of Rakinstown, County Meath. In 1843, he inherited the baronetcy on the death of his father. His paternal grandfather was Sir Thomas Dalrymple Hesketh, 3rd Baronet, who was born in New York City in 1777. The baronetcy had been created for his uncle in 1761 with special remainder to the first Baronet's younger brother Robert, who succeeded him as second Baronet.

He was educated at Christ Church, Oxford.

== Career ==
He was a Deputy Lieutenant and J.P. for Lancashire and Northamptonshire and in 1848 was High Sheriff of Lancashire. He was lieutenant-colonel of the 6th Administrative Battalion of Lancashire Rifle Volunteers and colonel of the 2nd Royal Lancashire Militia (The Duke of Lancaster's Own Rifles).

In 1862, Hesketh was elected Member of Parliament for Preston. He held the seat until his death at the age of 47 in 1872.

== Personal life ==
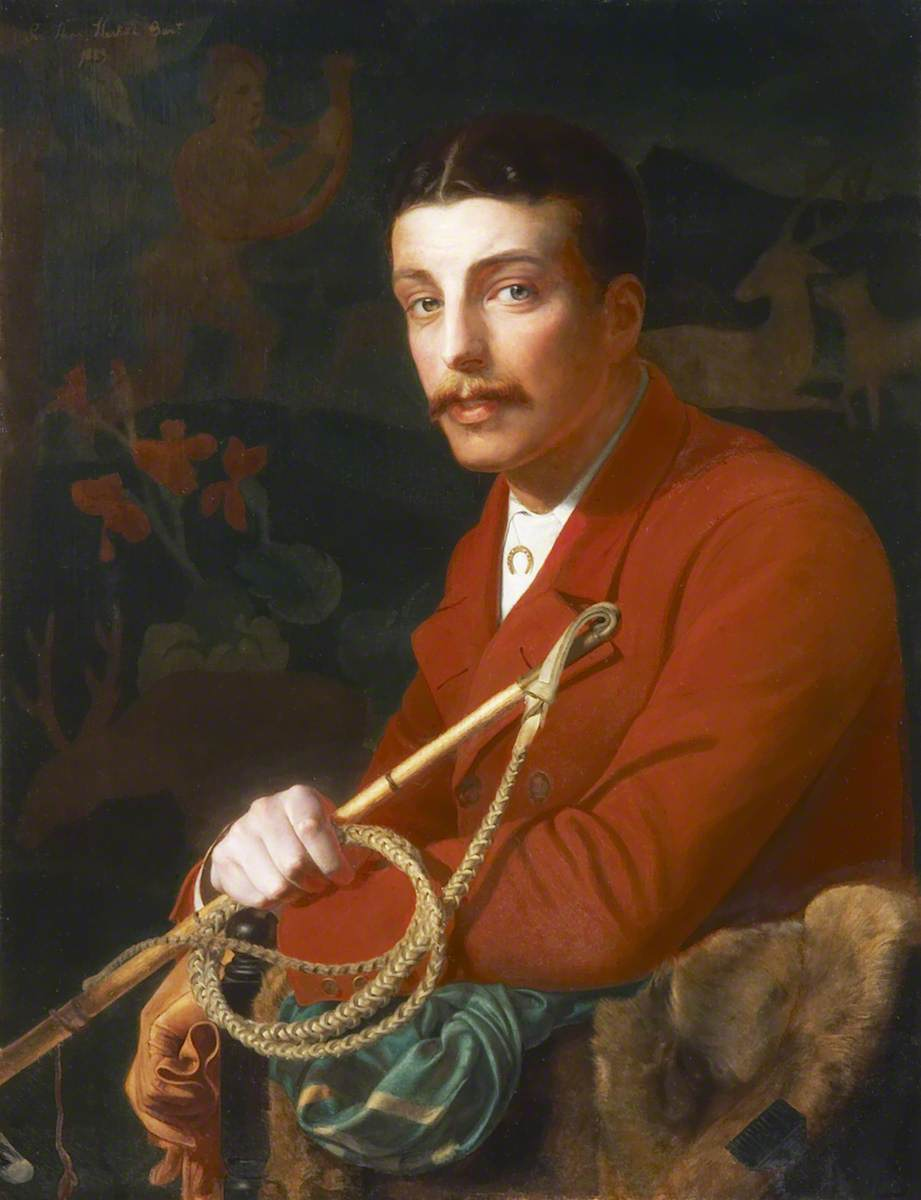
Portrait of his second son, Sir Thomas George Fermor-Hesketh by Frederick Sandys, 1883.

On 10 March 1846, Hesketh married Lady Arabella Fermor at St George's, Hanover Square in London. She was the sister and heiress of George Fermor, 5th Earl of Pomfret, and the daughter of General Thomas Fermor, 4th Earl of Pomfret who fought in the French Revolutionary and Napoleonic Wars and the former Annabel Elizabeth Borough. Together, they were the parents of:

- Edith Elizabeth Fermor-Hesketh (d. 1931), who married Lawrence Rawstorne in 1871.
- Sir Thomas Henry Fermor-Hesketh, 6th Baronet (1847–1876), who died unmarried at age 29.
- Sir Thomas George Fermor-Hesketh, 7th Baronet (1849–1924), who married the American heiress Florence Emily Sharon, a daughter of U.S. Senator William Sharon in 1880.
- Hugh Robert Hesketh (1850–1879)

On the death of his unmarried brother-in-law, George, in 1867, he inherited the 5,000 acre estate of Easton Neston. In 1868, he assumed by royal licence the additional name of Fermor for himself and his second son.

Sir Thomas, who spent his last years improving Easton Neston, died at age 47 on 20 August 1872 at Rufford Hall in Lancashire. he is buried in Rufford Church with his tomb sculpted by Matthew Noble.

Parliament of the United Kingdom
Preceded by R. A. Cross; Charles Grenfell	Member of Parliament for Preston; 1862 – 1872; With: Charles Grenfell to 1865; Frederick Stanley 1865–68; Edward Hermon from 1868	Succeeded by Edward Hermon; John Holker
Baronetage of Great Britain
Preceded by Thomas Henry Hesketh	Baronet (of Rufford); 1843–1872	Succeeded by Thomas Henry Fermor-Hesketh
