= Ernest Edwin Williams =

Welsh journalist, author and barrister

Ernest Edwin Williams (24 August 1866 – 20 March 1935) was a Welsh journalist, author and barrister.

The son of the solicitor George Edwin Williams, Ernest Williams was educated privately and at North London College School. He became a private secretary to a Liberal MP before travelling to North America to perform clerical work on ranches.

Upon returning to England he joined the Fabian Society (in March 1891), being at this time a socialist. During the next two years he was a speaker for the Society in London and in April 1893 he was elected to the Executive Committee of the Society. However he dissented from the majority of the Committee in that he supported the proposal for the Society to unite with the Social Democratic Federation and the Socialist League. He therefore resigned from the Committee in July 1894.

== Career in journalism ==
He became a journalist and in 1895 was asked by William Heinemann to investigate the threat to British industry from German competition. Williams wrote a series of articles for the New Review which were published in 1896 as ‘Made in Germany’. In this work he advocated protectionism and spoke to the Fabian Society on ‘Socialism and Protection’ but failed to convert them. In 1897 he wrote The German Menace and its English Apologists and Marching Backwards in reply to the arguments of free trade politicians.

In 1898 he became a leader write for the Daily Mail. He attacked Lord Curzon, a friend of the wife of the owner of the Daily Mail, and so was forced to resign. During 1899–1904 he wrote leading articles for the Financial News and protectionist articles for the Daily Express.

In 1903 the journal Commercial Intelligence commissioned Williams and Harold Cox to write a "fiscal duel" on free trade.

In later life Williams abandoned socialism, becoming a liberal individualist and chairman of The Freedom Association and a member of the executive of the Anti-Socialist Union. However with the Great Depression causing mass unemployment, Williams in 1930 wrote an unpublished manuscript advocating "Socialism without the state".

Williams also studied law, being called to the Bar as a member of the Inner Temple on 17 November 1905 as a barrister.

== Works ==
- ‘Made in Germany’ (1896).
- The German Menace and its English Apologists (1897).
- Marching Backwards (1897).
- The Foreigner in the Farmyard (1897).
- The Red Light: A Commentary on Mr. J. H. Thomas's ‘When Labour Rules’ (1921).
