= 1872 Preston by-election =

UK Parliamentary by-election

The 1872 Preston by-election was fought on 13 September 1872. The by-election was fought due to the death of one of the constituency's two Conservative MPs, Sir Thomas Fermor-Hesketh. It was won by the Conservative candidate John Holker.
