= 1881 Preston by-election =

UK Parliamentary by-election

The 1881 Preston by-election took place on 20 May 1881 after the death of the incumbent Conservative MP Edward Hermon. The Conservative candidate William Farrer Ecroyd campaigned on a fair trade platform and won the seat.

Preston by-election, 1881
Party	Candidate	Votes	%	±%
Conservative	William Farrer Ecroyd	6,004	58.0	−10.9
Liberal	Henry Yates Thompson	4,340	42.0	+10.9
Majority		1,664	16.0	+14.3
Turnout		10,344	88.0	−7.8 (est)
Registered electors		11,748		
Conservative hold		Swing	-10.9	
