= Tom Shaw (politician) =

British trade unionist and politician (1872–1938)

The Right Honourable Tom Shaw CBE
- Shaw in 1923

Secretary of State for War
- In office 7 June 1929 – 24 August 1931
- Monarch: George V
- Prime Minister: Ramsay MacDonald
- Preceded by: Sir Laming Worthington-Evans, Bt
- Succeeded by: The Marquess of Crewe

Personal details
- Born: 9 April 1872 Colne, Lancashire
- Died: 26 September 1938 (aged 66)
- Party: Labour

Thomas Shaw CBE PC (9 April 1872 – 26 September 1938) was a British trade unionist and Labour Party politician.

== Early life and education ==
Shaw was born in Waterside, Colne, Lancashire. He was the eldest son of a miner, Ellis Shaw, and his wife, Sarah Ann (née Wilkinson). At age 10, Shaw began working part-time in a textile factory, and two years later quit school to work full-time. Later, he took evening classes to catch up with his education and was particularly skillful in languages. His knowledge of German and French proved useful to him later in his career.

== Trade unions ==
Shaw was a strong supporter of unions. He joined the Colne Weavers' Association and became its secretary, and was a founding member of the Northern Counties Textile Trades Federation. He was Joint Secretary of Labour and Socialist International from 1923–1925. He was secretary of the International Federation of Textile Workers' Associations on a part-time basis from 1911 to 1924 and then full-time from 1925 to 1929, part-time until 1931, and then full-time again, a job that took him to nearly every country in Europe.

== Political career ==
He sat as Member of Parliament (MP) for Preston from December 1918 until he was unseated at the 1931 general election. He served as a Junior Whip, 1919; as Minister of Labour in the Labour Government 1924 and as Secretary of State for War from 1929–1931.

During the First World War, Shaw served as Director of national service for the West Midland Region. He was appointed a Commander of the Order of the British Empire in the 1919 New Year Honours. and appointed a Privy Counsellor in 1924.

Shaw served on several national commissions. In 1926, he headed a delegation to India investigate conditions in the textile industry there. From 1917 to 1920, he was a member of the Holman Gregory commission on workmen's compensation. He pushed for passage of a bill limiting to the 48-hour working week in 1919 and again in 1924.

Shaw did not support communist ideology, but favoured friendly political and trade relations with Russia.

== Personal life ==
In 1893, Shaw married Susannah Whitaker Sterne Ryan Woodhead. They had four daughters.

Shaw died in September 1938 in Middlesex, aged 66.

Parliament of the United Kingdom
Preceded by Hon. George Stanley; Urban H. Broughton	Member of Parliament for Preston; 1918–1931; With: Hon. George Stanley 1918–1922; James Hodge 1922–1924; Alfred Ravenscroft Kennedy 1924–1929; Sir William Jowitt 1929–1931	Succeeded by Adrian Moreing; William Kirkpatrick
Political offices
Preceded by Anderson Montague-Barlow	Minister of Labour; 1924	Succeeded by Sir Arthur Steel-Maitland, Bt
Preceded by Sir Laming Worthington-Evans, Bt	Secretary of State for War; 1929–1931	Succeeded by The Marquess of Crewe
Trade union offices
Preceded by G. Berry	General Secretary of the Colne Weavers' Association; 1905–1923	Succeeded by William H. Boocock
Preceded by New position	Secretary of the Northern Counties Textile Trades Federation; 1906–1919	Succeeded by Luke Bates
Preceded by James Brown and Edward Duxbury	Auditor of the Trades Union Congress; 1915–1916; With: J. Wood (1915); William Latham (1916)	Succeeded by Henry Boothman and Frank Hodges
Preceded by William Marsland	Secretary of the International Federation of Textile Workers; 1911–1924	Succeeded by James Bell
Preceded by James Bell	Secretary of the International Federation of Textile Workers' Associations; 1925–1938	Succeeded by Arthur Shaw
Party political offices
Preceded by New position	Secretary of the Labour and Socialist International; 1923–1925; With: Friedrich Adler (1923–1925)	Succeeded by Friedrich Adler
