= John Brograve =

English lawyer and politician

Sir John Brograve (1538–1613) was an English lawyer and politician. He was the Member of Parliament for Preston on several occasions, and once for Boroughbridge.

== Life ==
He was the son of Richard Brograve by his wife, daughter of Mr. Sares. He matriculated at St John's College, Cambridge in 1554. In 1576 he was an autumn reader at Gray's Inn, where he was admitted in 1555, and he was elected one of the treasurers there in February 1579–80, and again in February 1583–4.

In 1580, he was appointed her majesty's attorney for the Duchy of Lancaster, and he continued to hold that office under King James I, who conferred on him the honour of knighthood. He was nominated one of the counsel to the University of Cambridge in 1581. He resided at Braughing in Hertfordshire, of which county he was custos rotulorum for thirty years. He was M.P. for Preston 1586, 1597, and 1601, and for Boroughbridge 1593. He died on 11 September 1613, and was buried at Braughing.

By his marriage with Margaret, daughter of Simeon Steward of Lakenheath, Suffolk (she died 5 July 1593), he had issue three sons and two daughters.

== Works ==
He is the author of 'The Reading of Mr. John Brograve of Grayes Inne, made in Summer 1576, upon part of the Statute of 27 H. 8. C. 10, of Vses, concerning Jointures, beginning at the twelfth Branch thereof.' Printed in 'Three Learned Readings made upon three very useful Statutes, by Sir James Dyer, Brograve and Tristram Risdon,' London, 1648.
