= William Farrer Ecroyd =

English politician

William Farrer Ecroyd (14 July 1827 – 9 November 1915) was an English politician.

== Life ==
Ecroyd was born into a Quaker family, the son of William Ecroyd and Margaret Farrer. He joined the family firm, his father being a Lancashire mill owner. He officially entered into the partnership at Lomeshaye Mills near Nelson in 1849. He took control of the greatly expanded company along with his two half brothers, Richard and John, when his father died in 1876. He was widely known as an unselfish employer. Reading the works of theologians, Ecroyd abandoned Quakerism for Anglicanism after his father's death, and abandoned the traditional family Liberalism for Conservatism.

He stood unsuccessfully at Carlisle in the 1874 general election. As a young man he had been a member of the Anti-Corn Law League and was widely read in political economy. However, in the late 1870s his firm began to greatly suffer from foreign imports. In 1879 he published a pamphlet, The Policy of Self-Help, arguing that if Britain imposed import duties on wheat and manufactured goods, this would give her the leverage to negotiate with other countries in order to secure reciprocal free trade. Free imports from the colonies would also strengthen the cause of imperial federation and prevent Britain's decline into a third-rate power.

At the 1880 general election Ecroyd stood for North East Lancashire on this platform, denounced by his opponent Lord Hartington as "Ecroydism".

Ecroyd won the 1881 Preston by-election on a fair trade platform.

He stood down at the 1885 election due to ill health, however Lord Salisbury appointed him to the Royal Commission on the Depression in Trade and Industry, an outlet for his fair trade views.

With over fifty years service at his firm, Ecroyd retired in 1896. His retirement address (A Few Words to the Workers at Lomeshaye Mills) was on the duties of employers, with the factory viewed more as a venue for moral training than for accruing profits. In retirement he praised Joseph Chamberlain's agitation for Tariff Reform and possibly wrote several Tariff Reform pamphlets.

== Family ==
Ecroyd married in 1851 Mary Backhouse, daughter of Thomas Backhouse of York, who died in 1867. They had three sons and six daughters. Mary's fifth child was daughter Alizon who married notable mountaineer William Cecil Slingsby in 1882. Ecroyd married as his second wife Anna Maria Foster, in 1869. The historian and genealogist William Farrer was his second son.

== Notes ==
Parliament of the United Kingdom
Preceded by Edward Hermon	Member of Parliament for Preston; 1881 – 1885; With: John Holker until 1882; Henry Cecil Raikes in 1882; Sir William Tomlinson, Bt from 1882	Succeeded by Robert William Hanbury
