= Robert William Hanbury =

British politician (1845–1903)

The Right Honourable Robert William Hanbury
- Portrait, c. 1893-1903

President of the Board of Agriculture
- In office 16 November 1900 – 28 April 1903
- Monarchs: Victoria; Edward VII
- Prime Minister: The Marquess of Salisbury; Arthur Balfour
- Preceded by: Walter Long
- Succeeded by: The Earl of Onslow

Personal details
- Born: 24 February 1845
- Died: 28 April 1903 (aged 58)
- Party: Conservative
- Spouse(s): (1) Ismena Gepp (m. 1869; died 1871) (2) Ellen Hamilton (m. 1884)
- Education: Corpus Christi College, Oxford

Robert William Hanbury PC (24 February 1845 – 28 April 1903) was a British Conservative politician. He served as president of the Board of Agriculture from 1900 to 1903.

== Background and education ==
Hanbury was the only son of Robert Hanbury, of Bodehall House, Tamworth, Staffordshire, and his wife Mary, daughter of Major T. B. Bamford, of Wilnecote Hall, Warwickshire. The Hanbury family were landowners but mainly derived their wealth from collieries. He was orphaned at an early age and was educated at Rugby and Corpus Christi College, Oxford.

== Political career ==
In 1872 Hanbury was elected to the House of Commons as one of two representatives for Tamworth, a seat he held until 1878, and then sat for Staffordshire North until 1880, when he lost his seat. He unsuccessfully contested Preston in 1882, but won the seat in 1885. During the Liberal stay in power from 1892 to 1895 Hanbury was a vigorous critic of William Ewart Gladstone's Second Home Rule Bill from a financial perspective. When the Conservatives came to power in 1895 under Lord Salisbury, he was appointed financial secretary to the Treasury and sworn of the Privy Council. After the 1900 general election he was promoted to president of the Board of Agriculture, with a seat in the cabinet, by Salisbury. He held this post until his death three years later, the last year under the premiership of Arthur Balfour.

In August 1901 he received the Freedom of the City of Glasgow for services rendered in connection with the effort to obtain a licence to establish a municipal telephone exchange. He was elected a Fellow of the Royal Statistical Society in November 1902.

== Personal life ==
Hanbury married firstly Ismena Tindal, daughter of Thomas Morgan Gepp, in 1869. She died in 1871. He married secondly Ellen, only child of Knox Hamilton, in 1884. There were no children from the two marriages.

He died suddenly from pneumonia in April 1903, aged 58. He was buried in the churchyard at his country seat of Ilam, near Ashbourne, Derbyshire.

His widow married Victor Bowring and assumed the surname of Bowring-Hanbury.

Parliament of the United Kingdom
| Preceded by Sir Robert Peel, Bt; John Peel | Member of Parliament for Tamworth; 1872–1878; With: Sir Robert Peel, Bt | Succeeded by Sir Robert Peel, Bt; Hamar Bass |
| Preceded by Charles Adderley; Colin Minton Campbell | Member of Parliament for Staffordshire North; 1878–1880; With: Colin Minton Campbell | Succeeded by William Young Craig; Harry Davenport |
| Preceded by William Farrer Ecroyd; William Tomlinson | Member of Parliament for Preston; 1885–1903; With: Sir William Tomlinson, Bt | Succeeded by Sir William Tomlinson, Bt; John Kerr |
Political offices
| Preceded by Sir J. T. Hibbert | Financial Secretary to the Treasury; 1895–1900 | Succeeded by Austen Chamberlain |
| Preceded by Walter Long | President of the Board of Agriculture; 1900–1903 | Succeeded by The Earl of Onslow as President of the Board of Agriculture and Fisheries |
