= John Holker =

British lawyer, politician, and judge

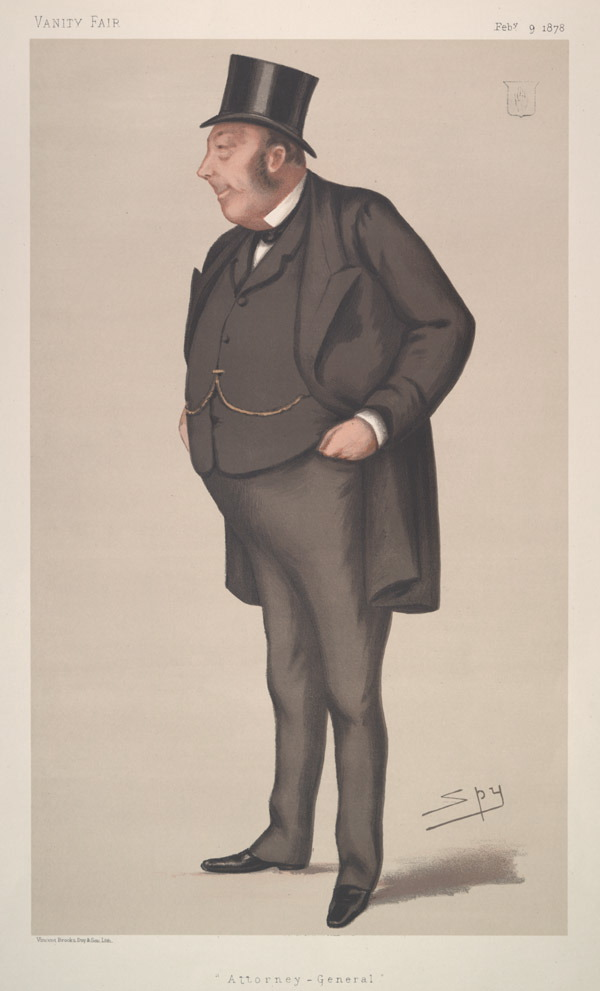
Caricature from Vanity Fair, 1878

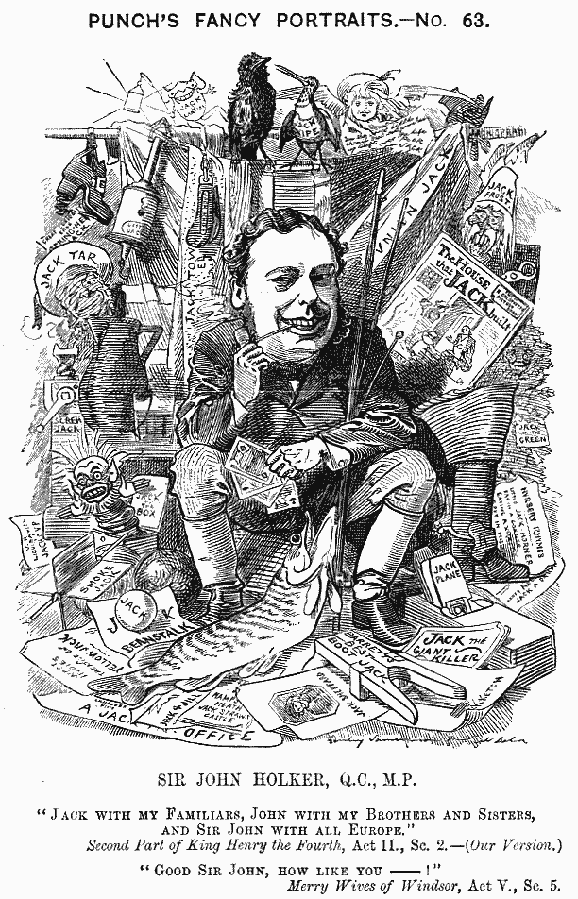
Caricature from Punch, 1881

Sir John Holker (1828 – 24 May 1882) was a British lawyer, politician, and judge. He sat as a Member of Parliament for Preston from 1872 until his death ten years later. He was first Solicitor General and later Attorney General in the second government of Benjamin Disraeli.

== Biography ==
Holker was born in Bury, Lancashire, and educated at Bury Grammar School. After being articled to a solicitor, he was called to the bar at Gray's Inn in 1854, where he was later a bencher, and treasurer in 1875. He joined the Northern Circuit, and lived in Manchester. He married in 1861 but had no children. After his first wife died, he remarried in 1874 to Miss Mary Lucia Richardson. There were no children from either marriage.

He returned to London in 1864, where he developed a very successful and lucrative legal practice, and was appointed Queen's Counsel in 1866.

He was the Conservative candidate at a by-election in Preston in 1872, one of the first held after the Ballot Act 1872 required the use of a secret ballot. He served as Member of Parliament for Preston until his death in 1882. He became Solicitor General in the government of Benjamin Disraeli in 1874, and was knighted. He replaced Sir Richard Baggallay as Attorney General in 1875, retaining in the position until Liberals won the general election in 1880.

He was appointed a Lord Justice of Appeal in January 1882, but resigned due to ill health in May, and died in London a few days later.

Parliament of the United Kingdom
Preceded by Sir Thomas Hesketh; Edward Hermon	Member of Parliament for Preston; 1872–1882; With: Edward Hermon to 1881; William Farrer Ecroyd from 1881	Succeeded by William Farrer Ecroyd; Henry Cecil Raikes
Legal offices
Preceded by Sir Richard Baggallay	Solicitor General for England and Wales; 1874–1875	Succeeded by Sir Hardinge Giffard
Preceded by Sir Richard Baggallay	Attorney General for England and Wales; 1875–1880	Succeeded by Sir Henry James
