= William Barne (died 1562) =

English politician

William Barne or Berners (by 1527 – 1562), of Harlton and Milton, Cambridgeshire, was an English landowner and politician.

He married Alice Cook, widow of William Cook (d.1553) of Chesterton, Cambridge, who had inherited Milton Manor.

He was a Member (MP) of the Parliament of England for Preston, Lancashire, in April 1554.

Barne acquired a number of landholdings around Cambridge. He acquired the manor of Grantchester in 1559-60. He also owned the manor of Harlton, which he had purchased from the Hutton family in 1561, shortly before his death. In the same year he acquired an interest in the manor of Trumpington.

On William's death, his estates passed to his son Robert. Robert, a Roman Catholic convert, fell into financial problems and sold the estates to his brother-in-law, Edward Slegge.
