= Preston (constituency) =

UK Parliament constituency (since 1983)

- Borough constituency for the House of Commons
- Interactive map of boundaries since 2024
- Location within North West England
- County: Lancashire
- Electorate: 72,946 (March 2020)
- Major settlements: Preston

Current constituency
- Created: 1983
- Member of Parliament: Sir Mark Hendrick (Labour Co-op)
- Seats: One
- Created from: Preston North, Preston South

1529–1950
- Seats: Two
- Replaced by: Preston North, Preston South

1295–1311 (at the earliest)
- Seats: Two
- Replaced by: Preston (see above)

Preston is a constituency (Note: A borough constituency (for the purposes of election expenses and type of returning officer)) represented in the House of Commons of the UK Parliament since 2000 by Sir Mark Hendrick, a member of the Labour Party and Co-operative Party. (Note: As with all constituencies, the constituency elects one Member of Parliament (MP) by the first past the post system of election at least every five years.)

== Constituency profile ==
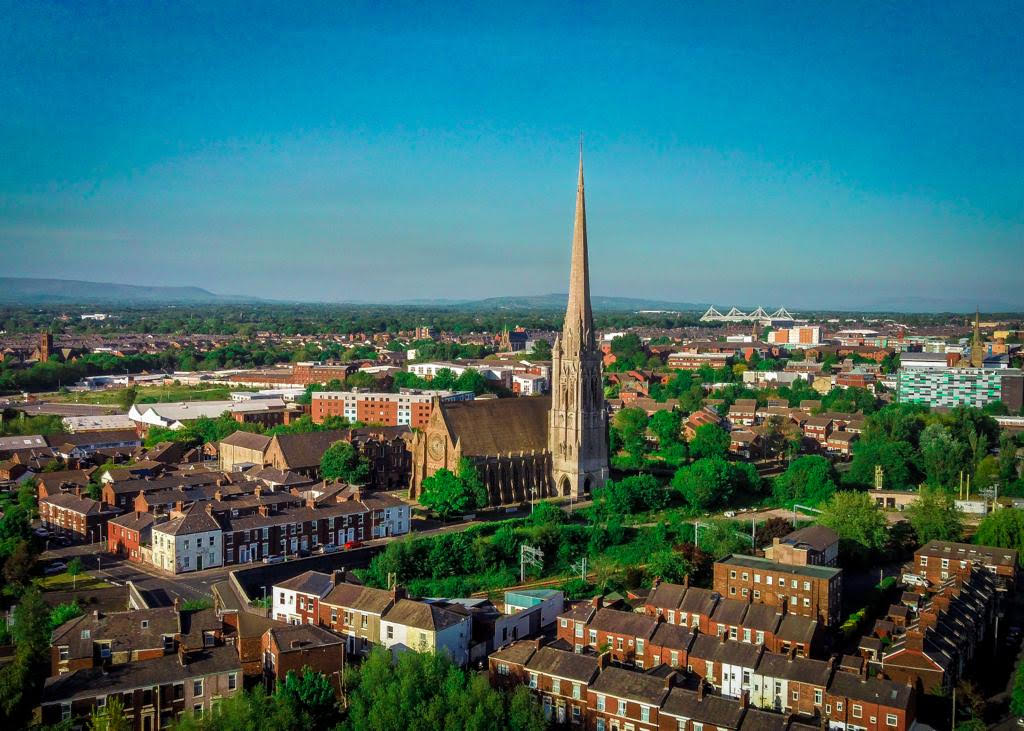
Church of St Walburge and its surroundings

Preston is a constituency in Lancashire in North West England. It covers most of the city of Preston, including the city centre and the suburbs of Lea, Ashton-on-Ribble, Ingol, Ribbleton and Brookfield.

Preston was traditionally a rural market town until the 19th century when, like much of Lancashire, it rapidly developed into an industrial centre for textile manufacturing. The decline of industry in the late 20th century left Preston with high rates of unemployment and most of the city remains highly-deprived today. Most residents live in post-war blocks of flats or dense terraced housing, although the northern suburbs are more affluent with many semi-detached properties. House prices in Preston are generally lower than the rest of North West England and the average price is less than half the overall UK average.

Preston has a low proportion of retirees and a large young adult population; this constituency contains the University of Lancashire which has around 24,000 students. Residents have below-average levels of income and homeownership, and the child poverty rate is high. They have average levels of education and a high proportion work in the retail and defence sectors; aerospace manufacturer BAE Systems has two major facilities in nearby villages. The percentage of residents claiming unemployment benefits is high. White people made up 70% of the population at the 2021 census. Asians, mostly of Indian origin, were the largest ethnic minority group at 22%. The Asian community was largely concentrated in the neighbourhoods immediately north and east of the city centre, where they made up around half the population.

At the local council level, the centre of Preston is mostly represented by Labour Party councillors and the outer suburbs by Liberal Democrats, although some Green Party and Reform UK representatives were elected at the most recent election. An estimated 55% of voters in Preston supported leaving the European Union in the 2016 referendum, marginally higher than the UK-wide figure of 52%.

== History ==
1295–1950

The seat was created for the Model Parliament and sent members until at least 1331 until a new (possibly confirmatory) grant of two members to Westminster followed. From 1529 extending unusually beyond the 19th century until the 1950 general election the seat had two-member representation. Party divisions tended to run stronger after 1931 before which two different parties' candidates frequently came first and second at elections under the bloc vote system.

In 1929, a recently elected Liberal, Sir William Jowitt decided to join the Labour Party and called for a by-election (which implies a single vacancy) to support this change of party, which he won, to take up for two years the position of Attorney General for England and Wales as part of the Government. He became the highest judge during the Attlee Ministry, the Lord High Chancellor of Great Britain and Speaker of the House of Lords under a then hereditary-dominated House leading to a Conservative majority. Consequently, he was selected to be elevated to a peerage as 1st Earl Jowitt. With no sons, he was to be the last Earl and wrote the Dictionary of English Law.

1950–1983

Preston was abolished as a constituency by the Representation of the People Act 1948, being replaced by the Preston North and Preston South constituencies for the 1950 general election.

1983–present

Since the seat's revival after being split for 33 years into the larger North and South seats, all representatives have been members of the Labour Party.

The member from 1987 to 2000 was Audrey Wise, a member of the Socialist Campaign Group and reformer of maternity healthcare in opposition on the Select Committee.

== Boundaries ==
=== Historic ===
==== Two-member seat (1832–1950) ====
1832–1868: The old borough of Preston, and the township of Fishwick.

1868–1885: The existing parliamentary borough, excluding such part (if any) as lies on the south side of the River Ribble.

1885–1918: The existing parliamentary borough, so much of the municipal borough of Preston as was not already included in the parliamentary borough, so much of the parish of Lea, Ashton, Ingol, and Cottam, and of the parish of Penwortham, as were added to the municipal borough of Preston on 1 June 1889 by the Ribble Navigation and Preston Dock Act 1883, and the local government district of Fulwood.

1918–1950: County borough of Preston and urban district of Fulwood:

==== Single-member seat (1983 onwards) ====
1983–1997: The Borough of Preston wards of Ashton, Avenham, Brookfield, Central, Deepdale, Fishwick, Ingol, Larches, Moorbrook, Park, Ribbleton, St John's, St Matthew's, and Tulketh.

The boundaries of the re-established constituency corresponded to those of former County Borough, with Fulwood being included in the new seat of Ribble Valley.

1997–2010: The Borough of Preston wards of Ashton, Avenham, Brookfield, Central, Deepdale, Fishwick, Larches, Moor Park, Ribbleton, Riversway, St Matthew's, and Tulketh, and the Borough of South Ribble wards of Bamber Bridge Central, Bamber Bridge South, and Walton-le-Dale.

Ingol ward was transferred to Fylde. The Borough of South Ribble wards were transferred from the constituency of South Ribble.

Map of boundaries from 2010 to 2024

2010–2018: The City of Preston wards of Ashton, Brookfield, Deepdale, Fishwick, Ingol, Larches, Moor Park, Ribbleton, Riversway, St George's, St Matthew's, Town Centre, Tulketh, and University.

Movements in 1997 reversed.

The ward of Lea was within the constituency of Fylde. The wards of Preston Rural North, Preston Rural East and the Fulwood wards (Cadley, College, Garrison, Greyfriars and Sharoe Green) were within the constituency of Wyre and Preston North. By the end of the review, the newly recommended Preston constituency had the smallest number of voters of an English constituency based on 2006 electorates.

2018–2024: In full: Ashton, Brookfield, City Centre, Deepdale, Fishwick and Frenchwood, Plungington, Ribbleton, St Matthews. In part: Cadley (shared with Wyre and Preston North), Ingol and Cottam (shared with Fylde), Lea and Larches (shared with Fylde).

The Local Government Boundary Commission for England modified Preston City Council's ward boundaries and names in 2018, which altered the contents, but not the boundaries of the Parliamentary constituency of Preston. Due to the changes, some wards were shared with neighbouring seats.

=== Current ===
Further to the 2023 review of Westminster constituencies, which came into effect for the 2024 general election, the constituency is composed of the following wards of the City of Preston (as they existed on 1 December 2020):

- Ashton, Brookfield, Cadley, City Centre, Deepdale, Fishwick & Frenchwood, Garrison, Ingol & Cottam, Lea & Larches, Plungington, Ribbleton, and St Matthew's.

The constituency was expanded to bring the electorate within the permitted range by transferring in the part wards currently in the Fylde constituency, together with the remainder of the Cadley ward and the Garrison ward from Wyre and Preston North (abolished).

== Members of Parliament ==
=== MPs 1295–1640 ===
Parliament	First member	Second member
1295	Willielmus fil' (filius) Pauli	Adam Russel
1298	Adam fil' Radulfi	Adam de Biri
1300/1	Willielmus fil' Paulini	
1304/5	Robertus fil' Willelmi de Preston	Hernricus fil' Willelmi del Tounhende
1306/7	Robertus fil' Rogeri	Ricardus Banastre
1307	Henricus del Krykestyle	Ricardus Banastre
1326/7	Laurencius Travers	Willelmus de Graistok
1327 (Nov)	John Stakky	Henry Banastre
1328/9 (Feb)	Willielmus fil' Paulini	Nicholaus de Preston
1330 (Nov)	William fitz Paul	Henry de Haydock
1331 (Sep)	Johannes fil' Galfridi	Willielmus fil' Johannis
1331–1529	No returns	
1529	Cristoferus Heydock	James Walton
1536–1545	No returns	
1545	Sir Ralph Sadler	John Bourne
1547	George Frevil	John Hales
1552/3 (Mar)	Anthony Browne	Thomas Fleetwood
1553 (Oct)	William Gerard	Anthony Browne
1554 (Apr)	Thomas Ruthall	Willielmus Berners
1554 (Nov)	Richard Shyrburne	John Sylyard
1555	John Arundell	John Herle
1557/8	Richard Sherbourne	Robert Southwell
1559 (Jan)	Robert Aalford	Francis Goldsmith, sat for Helston, repl, by Richard Cooke
1562/3	Gilbert Moreton	James Hodgkinson
1571	Edward Baeshe	Reginald Williams
1572	James Hodgkinson	George Horsey
1584 (Nov)	William Fleetwood	Thomas Cromwell
1586	John Brograve	Sir Thomas Hesketh
1588 (Oct)	Sir Thomas Hesketh	Michael Doughty
1593	James Dalton	Thomas Bulbeck
1597 (Oct)	John Brograve	Sir John Stanhope
1601 (Oct)	John Brograve	William Waad
1604-1611	Sir Vincent Skinner	William Holte
1614	Sir Edward Mosley	Henry Banister
1621-1622	Sir Edward Mosley	Sir William Pooley
1624	Sir Edward Mosley	Sir William Pooley, sat for Sudbury, repl. by Sir William Hervey
1625	Sir William Hervey	Henry Banister
1626	George Garrard	Thomas Fanshawe
1628	Robert Carre	George Garrard
1629-1640	No Parliaments summoned	

=== MPs 1640–1950 ===
Year	First member	First party	Second member	Second party
April 1640	Richard Shuttleworth	Parliamentarian	Thomas Standish	Parliamentarian
November 1640	Richard Shuttleworth	Parliamentarian	Thomas Standish	Parliamentarian
November 1642	Richard Shuttleworth	Parliamentarian	Standish died November 1642 - seat vacant	
1645	Richard Shuttleworth	Parliamentarian	William Langton	
December 1648	Shuttleworth excluded in Pride's Purge - seat vacant		Langton not recorded as sitting after Pride's Purge	
1653	Preston was unrepresented in the Barebones Parliament			
1654	Colonel Richard Shuttleworth		Preston had only one seat in the First and Second Parliaments of the Protectorate	
1656	Colonel Richard Shuttleworth		Preston had only one seat in the First and Second Parliaments of the Protectorate	
January 1659	Colonel Richard Shuttleworth		Colonel Richard Standish	
May 1659	Not represented in the restored Rump			
April 1660	Alexander Rigby		Richard Standish	
August 1660	Edward Rigby		Edward Fleetwood	
1661	Edward Rigby		Geoffrey Rishton	
1667	Edward Rigby		John Otway	
February 1679	Edward Rigby		Sir Robert Carr	
April 1679	Edward Rigby		Sir John Otway	
1681	Sir Robert Carr		Sir Gervase Elwes	
April 1685	Sir Thomas Chicheley		Edward Fleetwood	
June 1685	Hon. Andrew Newport	Tory	Edward Fleetwood	
1689	James Stanley		Thomas Patten	
March 1690	Lord Willoughby de Eresby		Christopher Greenfield	
December 1690	Sir Edward Chisenhall		Christopher Greenfield	
1695	Sir Thomas Stanley		Thomas Molyneux	
1698	Henry Ashhurst		Thomas Molyneux	
January 1701	Henry Ashhurst		Edward Rigby	
December 1701	Henry Ashhurst		Thomas Molyneux	
1702	Charles Zedenno Stanley		Sir Cyril Wyche	
1705	Francis Annesley		Edward Rigby	
1706	Francis Annesley		Arthur Maynwaring	
1708	Henry Fleetwood		Arthur Maynwaring	
1710	Henry Fleetwood		Sir Henry Hoghton	
1713	Henry Fleetwood		Edward Southwell	Tory
1715	Henry Fleetwood		Sir Henry Hoghton	
1722	Daniel Pulteney		Thomas Hesketh	
1727	Daniel Pulteney		Sir Henry Hoghton	
1732	Nicholas Fazackerley		Sir Henry Hoghton	
1741	Nicholas Fazackerley		James Shuttleworth	
1754	Nicholas Fazackerley		Edmund Starkie	
1767	Sir Peter Leicester		Edmund Starkie	
April 1768	Sir Peter Leicester		Sir Frank Standish	
November 1768	Brigadier John Burgoyne	Whig	Sir Henry Hoghton	Tory
1792	William Shawe	Non-partisan	Sir Henry Hoghton	Tory
1795	William Shawe	Non-partisan	Sir Henry Hoghton	Whig
1796	Edward Smith-Stanley	Whig	Sir Henry Hoghton	Whig
1802	Edward Smith-Stanley	Whig	John Horrocks	Tory
1804	Edward Smith-Stanley	Whig	Samuel Horrocks	Tory
1812	Edmund Hornby	Whig	Samuel Horrocks	Tory
1826	Hon. Edward Smith-Stanley	Whig	John Wood	Whig
December 1830	Henry Hunt	Radical	John Wood	Whig
1832	(Sir) Peter Hesketh-Fleetwood	Conservative	Hon. Henry Smith-Stanley	Whig
1837	(Sir) Peter Hesketh-Fleetwood	Whig	Robert Townley Parker	Conservative
1841	(Sir) Peter Hesketh-Fleetwood	Whig	Sir George Strickland	Whig
1847	Charles Grenfell	Whig	Sir George Strickland	Whig
1852	Robert Townley Parker	Conservative	Sir George Strickland	Whig
1857	Charles Grenfell	Whig	R. A. Cross	Conservative
1859	Charles Grenfell	Liberal	R. A. Cross	Conservative
1862 by-election	Charles Grenfell	Liberal	Sir Thomas Hesketh	Conservative
1865	Hon. Frederick Stanley	Conservative	Sir Thomas Hesketh	Conservative
1868	Edward Hermon	Conservative	Sir Thomas Hesketh	Conservative
1872 by-election	Edward Hermon	Conservative	(Sir) John Holker	Conservative
1881 by-election	William Farrer Ecroyd	Conservative	(Sir) John Holker	Conservative
February 1882 by-election	William Farrer Ecroyd	Conservative	Henry Cecil Raikes	Conservative
November 1882 by-election	William Farrer Ecroyd	Conservative	(Sir) William Tomlinson	Conservative
1885	Robert William Hanbury	Conservative	(Sir) William Tomlinson	Conservative
1903 by-election	John Kerr	Conservative	(Sir) William Tomlinson	Conservative
1906	John Thomas Macpherson	Labour	Harold Cox	Liberal
January 1910	Major the Hon. George Stanley	Conservative	Alfred Tobin	Conservative
1915 by-election	Major the Hon. George Stanley	Conservative	Urban H. Broughton	Conservative
1918	Major the Hon. George Stanley	Conservative	Thomas Shaw	Labour
1922	James Hodge	Liberal	Thomas Shaw	Labour
1924	Alfred Ravenscroft Kennedy	Conservative	Thomas Shaw	Labour
1929	Sir William Jowitt	Liberal	Thomas Shaw	Labour
1929 by-election	Sir William Jowitt	Labour	Thomas Shaw	Labour
1931	Adrian Moreing	Conservative	William Kirkpatrick	Conservative
1936 by-election	Adrian Moreing	Conservative	Edward Cobb	Conservative
1940 by-election	Randolph Churchill	Conservative	Edward Cobb	Conservative
1945	John William Sunderland	Labour	Samuel Segal	Labour
1946 by-election	Edward Shackleton	Labour	Samuel Segal	Labour

=== MPs since 1983 ===
Election	Member	Party	Notes
1983	Stan Thorne	Labour	Previously MP for Preston South 1974–1983
1987	Audrey Wise	Labour	Previously MP for Coventry South West 1974–1979. Died September 2000
2000 by-election	Sir Mark Hendrick	Labour and Co-operative	Became a Knight Bachelor in 2018 New Year Honours

== Overview ==
Representatives have sat in Parliament for Preston for nearly 800 years, the first recorded names being Willielmus fil' Pauli and Adam Russel. Prior to being reformed as "Preston" in 1983, the former Preston North and Preston South seats were amongst the most marginal in the country - in 1979, Conservative Robert Atkins won Preston North by 29 votes.

With the suburban, middle class former Fulwood Urban District area within Ribble Valley (and from 2010 Wyre and Preston North), the southern portion has awarded MPs with much healthier and secure majorities. Almost all of Preston's representatives from 1915 to 1950, and since its recreation as a single constituency in 1983, have been Labour candidates.

Between 1918 and 1949, the two-seat constituency of Preston was formed by the County Borough of Preston and the Urban District of Fulwood. In 1997, Audrey Wise secured a majority of over 18,000. The collapse of the Conservative vote - 10 percentage points down from 1992 - was firmly with the pattern of the Tory fortunes in that year.

The death of Audrey Wise in 2000 triggered a by-election. At that Preston by-election, Mark Hendrick, former Member of the European Parliament (MEP) for the Lancashire Central constituency with Preston at its heart, secured a victory with a 4,400 majority. The surprise of the night was the result of the fledgling Socialist Alliance, for whom Terry Cartright saved his deposit.

Less than a year later, the 2001 general election returned Mark Hendrick with a much healthier 12,200 majority, up against South Ribble councillor Graham O'Hare for the Conservatives and the then local Liberal Democrat leader Bill Chadwick. In real terms, all three main parties lost support from 1997 - Labour down by over 8,000 votes, Conservatives reduced by over 2,200 and Lib Dems 2,300 lower. One notable candidate in 2001 was David Braid, also a candidate in a number of other seats that year, who had been the "Battle for Britain" candidate in the previous year's by-election.

The 2005 general election was notable for the changes in share of the vote of the minor parties. The first ever Respect candidate, local councillor Michael Lavalette, firmly saved his deposit with nearly 7% of the vote. The Liberal Democrats had chosen former Conservative County Councillor William Parkinson, and had their best result since 1997. Fiona Bryce for the Conservatives, remained in second place seeing her share of the vote remain stable despite the United Kingdom Independence Party (UKIP) polling over 1,000 votes. Mark Hendrick secured another term as MP, although his vote total was 3,000 less than 2001 and 12,000 less than Audrey Wise in 1997.

Labour continued to represent Preston at the elections of 2010, 2015, and 2017. Whilst Mark Hendrick secured less than 50% of the votes cast in 2010, the first time this has occurred at a Preston election since 1983, subsequent results had much stronger Labour majorities. Second place went back to the Conservative Party, regaining from the Liberal Democrats who took second place for the first time in 2010.

== Elections ==
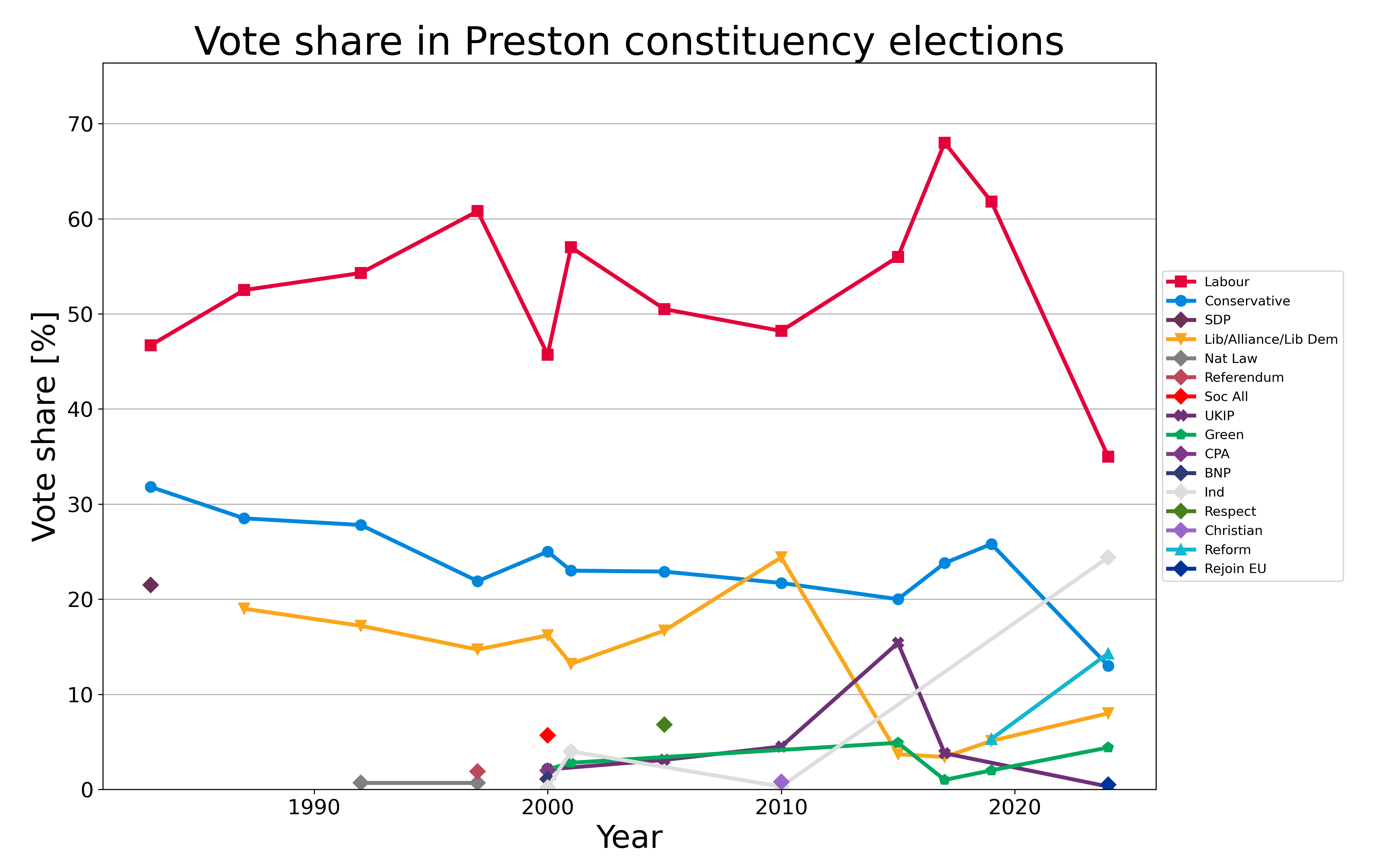
Preston constituency election results, 1983–2024

=== Elections in the 2020s ===
General election 2024: Preston
Party	Candidate	Votes	%	±%
Labour Co-op	Mark Hendrick	14,006	35.0	−22.3
Independent	Michael Lavalette	8,715	21.8	New
Reform	James Elliot	5,738	14.3	+10.1
Conservative	Trevor Hart	5,212	13.0	−16.8
Liberal Democrats	Neil Darby	3,195	8.0	+2.9
Green	Isabella Metcalf-Riener	1,751	4.4	+2.4
Independent	Yousuf Bhailok	891	2.2	New
Rejoin EU	Joseph O'Meachair	216	0.5	New
Alliance for Democracy and Freedom	David Brooks	145	0.4	New
UKIP	Derek Kileen	124	0.3	New
Majority		5,291	13.2	
Turnout		39,993	51.7	−7.6
Labour Co-op hold		Swing		

=== Elections in the 2010s ===
General election 2019: Preston
Party	Candidate	Votes	%	±%
Labour Co-op	Mark Hendrick	20,870	61.8	−6.2
Conservative	Michele Scott	8,724	25.8	+2.0
Brexit Party	Rob Sherratt	1,799	5.3	New
Liberal Democrats	Neil Darby	1,737	5.1	+1.7
Green	Michael Welton	660	2.0	+1.0
Majority		12,146	36.0	−8.2
Turnout		33,790	56.6	−5.0
Labour Co-op hold		Swing	−4.1	

General election 2017: Preston
Party	Candidate	Votes	%	±%
Labour Co-op	Mark Hendrick	24,210	68.0	+12.0
Conservative	Kevin Beaty	8,487	23.8	+3.8
UKIP	Simon Platt	1,348	3.8	−11.6
Liberal Democrats	Neil Darby	1,204	3.4	−0.3
Green	Anne Power	348	1.0	−3.9
Majority		15,723	44.2	+8.2
Turnout		35,597	61.6	+5.8
Labour Co-op hold		Swing	+4.0	

General election 2015: Preston
Party	Candidate	Votes	%	±%
Labour Co-op	Mark Hendrick	18,755	56.0	+7.8
Conservative	Richard Holden	6,688	20.0	−1.7
UKIP	James Barker	5,139	15.4	+10.9
Green	Gemma Christie	1,643	4.9	New
Liberal Democrats	Jo Barton	1,244	3.7	−20.7
Majority		12,067	36.0	+12.2
Turnout		33,469	55.8	+3.8
Labour Co-op hold		Swing	+4.8	

General election 2010: Preston
Party	Candidate	Votes	%	±%
Labour Co-op	Mark Hendrick	15,668	48.2	−2.3
Liberal Democrats	Mark Jewell	7,935	24.4	+7.7
Conservative	Nerissa Warner-O'Neill	7,060	21.7	−1.2
UKIP	Richard Muirhead	1,462	4.5	+1.4
Christian	George Ambroze	272	0.8	New
Independent	Krishna Tayya	108	0.3	New
Majority		7,733	23.8	−3.8
Turnout		32,505	52.0	−1.8
Labour Co-op hold		Swing	−5.0	

=== Elections in the 2000s ===
General election 2005: Preston
Party	Candidate	Votes	%	±%
Labour Co-op	Mark Hendrick	17,210	50.5	−6.5
Conservative	Fiona Bryce	7,803	22.9	−0.1
Liberal Democrats	William Parkinson	5,701	16.7	+3.5
Respect	Michael Lavalette	2,318	6.8	New
UKIP	Ellen Boardman	1,049	3.1	New
Majority		9,407	27.6	−5.6
Turnout		34,081	53.8	+4.6
Labour Co-op hold		Swing	−3.2	

General election 2001: Preston
Party	Candidate	Votes	%	±%
Labour Co-op	Mark Hendrick	20,540	57.0	−3.8
Conservative	Graham O'Hare	8,272	23.0	+1.1
Liberal Democrats	William Chadwick	4,746	13.2	−1.5
Independent	Bilal Patel	1,241	3.4	New
Green	Richard Merrick	1,019	2.8	N/A
Independent	David Franklin-Braid	223	0.6	N/A
Majority		12,268	34.0	−4.9
Turnout		36,041	49.2	−16.6
Labour Co-op hold		Swing	−2.5	

2000 Preston by-election
Party	Candidate	Votes	%	±%
Labour Co-op	Mark Hendrick	9,765	45.7	−15.1
Conservative	Graham O'Hare	5,339	25.0	+3.1
Liberal Democrats	Bill Chadwick	3,454	16.2	+1.5
Socialist Alliance	Terry Cartwright	1,210	5.7	New
UKIP	Gregg Beaman	458	2.1	New
Green	Richard Merrick	441	2.1	New
CPA	Peter Garrett	416	2.0	New
BNP	Chris Jackson	229	1.1	New
Independent	David Franklin-Braid	51	0.2	New
Majority		4,426	20.7	−18.2
Turnout		21,363	29.4	−36.4
Labour Co-op hold		Swing	−9.1	

=== Elections in the 1990s ===
General election 1997: Preston
Party	Candidate	Votes	%	±%
Labour	Audrey Wise	29,220	60.8	+6.5
Conservative	Paul S. Gray	10,540	21.9	−5.9
Liberal Democrats	William Chadwick	7,045	14.7	−2.5
Referendum	John C. Porter	924	1.9	New
Natural Law	John Ashforth	345	0.7	±0.0
Majority		18,680	38.9	+12.4
Turnout		48,074	65.8	−5.9
Labour hold		Swing	+6.2	

General election 1992: Preston
Party	Candidate	Votes	%	±%
Labour	Audrey Wise	24,983	54.3	+1.8
Conservative	Simon G. O'Toole	12,808	27.8	−0.7
Liberal Democrats	William Chadwick	7,897	17.2	−1.8
Natural Law	Janet Aycliffe	341	0.7	New
Majority		12,175	26.5	+2.5
Turnout		46,029	71.7	+0.7
Labour hold		Swing	+1.3	

=== Elections of the 1980s ===
General election 1987: Preston
Party	Candidate	Votes	%	±%
Labour	Audrey Wise	23,341	52.5	+5.8
Conservative	Raj Chandran	12,696	28.5	−3.3
Liberal	John Wright	8,452	19.0	−2.5
Majority		10,645	24.0	+9.1
Turnout		44,489	71.0	−0.8
Labour hold		Swing	+4.6	

General election 1983: Preston
Party	Candidate	Votes	%	±%
Labour	Stan Thorne	21,810	46.7	
Conservative	Tom N. Huntley	14,832	31.8	
SDP	Michael Connolly	10,039	21.5	
Majority		6,978	14.9	
Turnout		46,681	71.8	
Labour win (new seat)				

=== Elections in the 1940s ===
1946 Preston by-election
Party	Candidate	Votes	%	±%
Labour	Edward Shackleton	32,189	55.6	+7.3
Conservative	Harmar Nicholls	25,718	44.4	+2.6
Majority		6,471	11.2	+8.4
Turnout		57,907		
Labour hold		Swing		

General election 1945: Preston (2 seats)
Party	Candidate	Votes	%	±%
Labour	Samuel Segal	33,053	24.2	
Labour	John William Sunderland	32,889	24.1	
Conservative	Randolph Churchill	29,129	21.4	
Conservative	Julian Amery	27,885	20.4	
Liberal	J Maurice Toulmin	8,251	6.1	New
Communist	P.J. Devine	5,168	3.8	New
Majority		3,760	2.8	N/A
Turnout		136,375	77.0	−2.0
Labour hold		Swing		

1940 Preston by-election
Party	Candidate	Votes	%	±%
Conservative	Randolph Churchill	Unopposed		
Conservative hold				

For the general election expected to take place in 1939/1940, the following candidates had been selected;

- Conservative: Adrian Moreing, Edward Cobb
- Labour: P.C. Hoffman, John William Sunderland

=== Elections in the 1930s ===
1936 Preston by-election
Party	Candidate	Votes	%	±%
Conservative	Edward Cobb	32,575	48.8	−4.8
Labour	Frank Bowles	30,970	46.4	±0.0
Independent	F. White	3,221	4.8	New
Majority		1,605	2.4	−1.0
Turnout		63,746	79.0	−2.9
Conservative hold		Swing		

General election 1935: Preston (2 seats)
Party	Candidate	Votes	%	±%
Conservative	Adrian Moreing	37,219	26.9	−5.3
Conservative	William Kirkpatrick	36,797	26.7	−5.8
Labour	Robert Arthur Lyster	32,225	23.3	+5.3
Labour	Richard Reiss	31,827	23.1	+5.8
Majority		4,572	3.4	−8.8
Turnout		138,068	81.9	−2.7
Conservative hold		Swing		

General election 1931: Preston (2 seats)
Party	Candidate	Votes	%	±%
Conservative	William Kirkpatrick	46,276	32.5	
Conservative	Adrian Moreing	45,843	32.2	
Labour	Tom Shaw	25,710	18.0	
Labour	Edward Porter	24,660	17.3	
Majority		20,133	14.2	N/A
Turnout		142,489	84.6	+6.4
Conservative gain from Labour		Swing		

=== Elections in the 1920s ===
1929 Preston by-election
Party	Candidate	Votes	%	±%
Labour	William Jowitt	35,608	54.6	+25.1
Unionist	Alfred Howitt	29,168	44.8	−0.7
Independent Labour	S. M. Holden	410	0.6	−1.0
Majority		6,440	9.8	+2.0
Turnout		65,186	79.6	+1.4
Labour hold		Swing		

General election 1929: Preston (2 seats)
Party	Candidate	Votes	%	±%
Labour	Tom Shaw	37,705	29.5	+3.2
Liberal	William Jowitt	31,277	24.4	−0.2
Unionist	Alfred Howitt	29,116	22.8	−2.4
Unionist	Charles Emmott	27,754	21.7	−2.2
Independent Labour	S. M. Holden	2,111	1.6	New
Majority		8,589	1.6	N/A
Turnout		127,963	78.2	
Labour hold		Swing		
Liberal gain from Unionist		Swing		

General election 1924: Preston
Party	Candidate	Votes	%	±%
Labour	Tom Shaw	27,009	26.3	−8.1
Unionist	Alfred Ravenscroft Kennedy	25,887	25.2	
Liberal	James Hodge	25,327	24.6	−9.0
Unionist	G Barnes	24,557	23.9	
Majority		560	0.6	N/A
Turnout		102,780		
Labour hold		Swing		
Unionist gain from Liberal		Swing		

General election 1923: Preston (2 seats)
Party	Candidate	Votes	%	±%
Labour	Tom Shaw	25,816	34.4	+6.5
Liberal	James Hodge	25,155	33.6	+7.2
Unionist	William Kirkpatrick	23,953	32.0	−13.7
Majority		1,854	2.4	−1.5
Majority		1,193	1.6	−0.8
Turnout		74,924	87.2	+6.1
Labour hold		Swing		
Liberal hold		Swing		

General election 1922: Preston (2 seats)
Party	Candidate	Votes	%	±%
Labour	Tom Shaw	26,259	27.9	+2.1
Liberal	James Hodge	24,798	26.4	+1.6
Unionist	George Stanley	22,574	24.0	−1.4
Unionist	Alfred Robert MacLean Camm	20,410	21.7	−2.3
Majority		3,685	3.9	+2.9
Labour hold		Swing		
Majority		2,224	2.4	N/A
Liberal gain from Unionist		Swing		
Turnout		94,041	81.1	+16.6
Registered electors		57,953		

=== Elections in the 1910s ===
- For all General Elections from 1906 to 1929 the Liberal and Labour parties ran only one candidate each, and these candidates ran in harness.

Stanley

General election 1918: Preston (2 seats)
Party		Candidate	Votes	%	±%
	Labour	✓ Tom Shaw	19,213	25.8	+2.8
C	Unionist	✓ George Stanley	18,970	25.4	−1.4
	Liberal	John O'Neill	18,485	24.8	+0.9
C	Unionist	Warwick Brookes	17,928	24.0	−2.3
Majority			1,285	1.8	N/A
	Labour gain from Unionist		Swing	+2.1	
Majority			485	0.6	−1.8
	Unionist hold		Swing	N/A	
Turnout			74,596	64.5	−24.4
Registered electors			57,795		
C indicates candidate endorsed by the coalition government.

1915 Preston by-election
Party	Candidate	Votes	%	±%
Unionist	Urban H. Broughton	Unopposed		
Unionist hold				

General Election 1914/15:

Another General Election was required to take place before the end of 1915. The political parties had been making preparations for an election to take place and by the July 1914, the following candidates had been selected;

- Unionist: George Stanley and Alfred Tobin
- Labour: Tom Shaw
- Liberal: Frederick Llewellyn-Jones

Young

General election December 1910: Preston (2 seats)
Party	Candidate	Votes	%	±%
Conservative	George Stanley	9,184	26.8	−0.3
Conservative	Alfred Tobin	8,993	26.3	+0.3
Liberal	Hilton Young	8,193	23.9	+6.1
Labour	William Henry Carr	7,855	23.0	+1.6
Majority		800	2.4	−2.2
Turnout		34,225	88.9	−5.5
Registered electors		19,521		
Conservative hold		Swing	−3.2	
Conservative hold		Swing	−0.7	

General election January 1910: Preston (2 seats)
Party	Candidate	Votes	%	±%
Conservative	George Stanley	9,526	27.1	+4.9
Conservative	Alfred Tobin	9,160	26.0	+5.1
Labour	John Thomas Macpherson	7,539	21.4	−9.5
Liberal	John Eldon Gorst	6,281	17.8	−8.2
Free Trader	Harold Cox*	2,704	7.7	New
Majority		1,621	4.6	N/A
Turnout		32,506	94.4	−1.8
Registered electors		19,521		
Conservative gain from Labour		Swing	+7.2	
Conservative gain from Liberal		Swing	+6.7	

* Cox was replaced as Liberal candidate by Gorst - due to his frequent criticism of Liberal social policy - but chose to run independently.

=== Elections in the 1900s ===
Cox

General election 1906: Preston (2 seats)
Party	Candidate	Votes	%	±%
Labour Repr. Cmte.	John Thomas Macpherson	10,181	30.9	+8.8
Liberal	Harold Cox	8,538	26.0	New
Conservative	John Kerr	7,303	22.2	−18.8
Conservative	William Tomlinson	6,856	20.9	−16.0
Turnout		32,878	96.2	+19.8
Registered electors		18,626		
Majority		2,878	8.7	N/A
Labour Repr. Cmte. gain from Conservative		Swing	+13.8	
Majority		1,682	5.1	N/A
Liberal gain from Conservative		Swing	N/A	

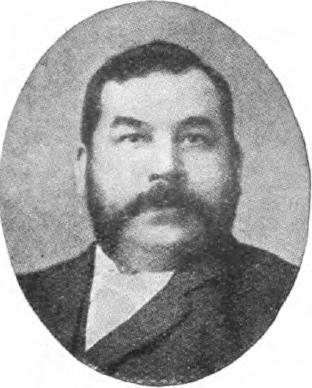
Hodge

1903 Preston by-election
Party	Candidate	Votes	%	±%
Conservative	John Kerr	8,639	57.1	−20.8
Labour Repr. Cmte.	John Hodge	6,490	42.9	+20.8
Majority		2,149	14.2	−0.6
Turnout		15,129	84.2	+7.8
Registered electors		17,973		
Conservative hold		Swing	−20.8	

1900 Preston by-election
Party	Candidate	Votes	%	±%
Conservative	Robert William Hanbury	Unopposed		
Conservative hold				

Hardie

General election 1900: Preston (2 seats)
Party	Candidate	Votes	%	±%
Conservative	Robert William Hanbury	8,944	41.0	−0.9
Conservative	William Tomlinson	8,067	36.9	+1.2
Labour Repr. Cmte.	Keir Hardie	4,834	22.1	New
Majority		3,233	14.8	+1.5
Turnout		21,845	76.4	+0.1
Registered electors		16,867		
Conservative hold		Swing	N/A	
Conservative hold		Swing	N/A	

=== Elections in the 1890s ===
Tomlinson

General election 1895: Preston (2 seats)
Party	Candidate	Votes	%	±%
Conservative	Robert William Hanbury	8,928	41.9	+5.3
Conservative	William Tomlinson	7,622	35.7	+0.4
Ind. Labour Party	James Tattersall	4,781	22.4	New
Majority		2,841	13.3	+6.1
Turnout		12,508	76.3	−11.4
Registered electors		16,395		
Conservative hold		Swing	N/A	
Conservative hold		Swing	N/A	

General election 1892: Preston (2 seats)
Party	Candidate	Votes	%	±%
Conservative	Robert William Hanbury	8,070	36.6	+6.9
Conservative	William Tomlinson	7,764	35.3	+4.7
Liberal	Charles Weld-Blundell	6,182	28.1	−11.6
Majority		1,582	7.2	−2.2
Turnout		14,003	87.7	+3.8
Registered electors		15,959		
Conservative hold		Swing	+6.4	
Conservative hold		Swing	+5.3	

=== Elections in the 1880s ===
General election 1886: Preston (2 seats)
Party	Candidate	Votes	%	±%
Conservative	William Tomlinson	7,497	30.6	−7.9
Conservative	Robert William Hanbury	7,296	29.7	−6.7
Liberal	John Ormerod Pilkington	4,982	20.3	−4.8
Lib-Lab	George Potter	4,771	19.4	N/A
Majority		2,314	9.4	−1.9
Turnout		12,473 (est)	83.9	−7.2
Registered electors		14,876		
Conservative hold		Swing	−2.8	
Conservative hold		Swing	−1.7	

Russell

General election 1885: Preston (2 seats)
Party	Candidate	Votes	%	±%
Conservative	William Tomlinson	8,459	38.5	+5.8
Conservative	Robert William Hanbury	7,971	36.4	+0.2
Liberal	Thomas Russell	5,491	25.1	−6.0
Majority		2,480	11.3	+9.7
Turnout		13,550 (est)	91.1	−4.7 (est)
Registered electors		14,876		
Conservative hold		Swing	+4.4	
Conservative hold		Swing	+1.6	

November 1882 Preston by-election
Party	Candidate	Votes	%	±%
Conservative	William Tomlinson	6,351	60.4	N/A
Conservative	Robert William Hanbury	4,167	39.6	N/A
Majority		2,184	20.8	N/A
Turnout		10,518	81.0	−14.8 (est)
Registered electors		12,978		
Conservative hold		Swing	N/A	

- Caused by Raikes' resignation to seek election in the 1882 Cambridge University by-election.

February 1882 Preston by-election
Party	Candidate	Votes	%	±%
Conservative	Henry Cecil Raikes	6,045	58.9	−10.0
Lib-Lab	William Simpson	4,212	41.1	+10.0
Majority		1,833	17.8	+16.2
Turnout		10,257	79.0	−16.8 (est)
Registered electors		12,978		
Conservative hold		Swing	−10.0	

- Caused by Holker's resignation upon appointment as a Lord Justice of Appeal.

1881 Preston by-election
Party	Candidate	Votes	%	±%
Conservative	William Farrer Ecroyd	6,004	58.0	−10.9
Liberal	Henry Yates Thompson	4,340	42.0	+10.9
Majority		1,664	16.0	+14.4
Turnout		10,344	88.0	−7.8 (est)
Registered electors		11,748		
Conservative hold		Swing	−10.9	

- Caused by Hermon's death.

General election 1880: Preston (2 seats)
Party	Candidate	Votes	%	±%
Conservative	Edward Hermon	6,239	36.2	−5.9
Conservative	John Holker	5,641	32.7	−1.0
Liberal	George William Bahr	5,355	31.1	+6.8
Majority		286	1.6	−7.8
Turnout		11,594 (est)	95.8 (est)	+16.1
Registered electors		12,108		
Conservative hold		Swing	−4.7	
Conservative hold		Swing	−2.2	

=== Elections in the 1870s ===
1874 Preston by-election
Party	Candidate	Votes	%	±%
Conservative	John Holker	Unopposed		
Conservative hold				

- Caused by Holker's appointment as Solicitor General for England and Wales.

General election 1874: Preston (2 seats)
Party	Candidate	Votes	%	±%
Conservative	Edward Hermon	6,512	42.1	+14.3
Conservative	John Holker	5,211	33.7	+6.4
Lib-Lab	Thomas Mottershead	3,756	24.3	−20.7
Majority		1,455	9.4	+4.8
Turnout		9,618 (est)	79.7 (est)	−17.4
Registered electors		12,073		
Conservative hold		Swing	+12.3	
Conservative hold		Swing	+8.4	

1872 Preston by-election
Party	Candidate	Votes	%	±%
Conservative	John Holker	4,542	54.3	−0.8
Liberal	James German	3,824	45.7	+0.7
Majority		718	8.6	+4.0
Turnout		8,366	81.9	−15.2
Registered electors		10,214		
Conservative hold		Swing	−0.8	

- Caused by Hesketh's death.

=== Elections in the 1860s ===
General election 1868: Preston (2 seats)
Party	Candidate	Votes	%	±%
Conservative	Edward Hermon	5,803	27.8	N/A
Conservative	Thomas Fermor-Hesketh	5,700	27.3	N/A
Liberal	Joseph Leese	4,741	22.7	New
Liberal	Edward Fitzalan-Howard	4,663	22.3	New
Majority		959	4.6	N/A
Turnout		10,454 (est)	97.1 (est)	N/A
Registered electors		10,763		
Conservative hold		Swing	N/A	
Conservative hold		Swing	N/A	

General election 1865: Preston (2 seats)
Party	Candidate	Votes	%	±%
Conservative	Thomas Hesketh	Unopposed		
Conservative	Frederick Stanley	Unopposed		
Registered electors		2,562		
Conservative hold				
Conservative gain from Liberal				

1862 Preston by-election
Party	Candidate	Votes	%	±%
Conservative	Thomas Hesketh	1,527	60.1	−9.1
Liberal	George Melly	1,014	39.9	+9.1
Majority		513	20.2	+11.6
Turnout		2,541	91.6	+17.9
Registered electors		2,773		
Conservative hold		Swing	−9.1	

- Caused by Cross' resignation.

=== Elections in the 1850s ===
General election 1859: Preston (2 seats)
Party	Candidate	Votes	%	±%
Conservative	R. A. Cross	1,542	39.4	+3.8
Liberal	Charles Grenfell	1,208	30.8	−6.5
Conservative	John Talbot Clifton	1,168	29.8	+2.7
Turnout		1,959 (est)	73.7 (est)	+1.6
Registered electors		2,657		
Majority		334	8.6	+0.1
Conservative hold		Swing	+3.5	
Majority		40	1.0	−0.7
Liberal hold		Swing	−6.5	

General election 1857: Preston (2 seats)
Party	Candidate	Votes	%	±%
Whig	Charles Grenfell	1,503	37.3	+11.7
Conservative	R. A. Cross	1,433	35.6	+5.3
Whig	George Strickland	1,094	27.1	−1.3
Turnout		2,015 (est)	72.1 (est)	−5.1
Registered electors		2,793		
Majority		70	1.7	−11.0
Whig hold		Swing	+4.5	
Majority		339	8.5	+3.8
Conservative hold		Swing	+0.1	

General election 1852: Preston (2 seats)
Party	Candidate	Votes	%	±%
Conservative	Robert Townley Parker	1,335	30.3	−2.6
Whig	George Strickland	1,253	28.4	−5.5
Whig	Charles Grenfell	1,127	25.6	−7.7
Radical	James German	692	15.7	N/A
Turnout		2,204 (est)	77.2 (est)	−13.2
Registered electors		2,854		
Majority		208	4.7	N/A
Conservative gain from Whig		Swing	+5.3	
Majority		561	12.7	+12.3
Whig hold		Swing	−2.1	

=== Elections in the 1840s ===
General election 1847: Preston (2 seats)
Party	Candidate	Votes	%	±%
Whig	George Strickland	1,404	33.9	+5.9
Whig	Charles Grenfell	1,378	33.3	+4.8
Conservative	Robert Townley Parker	1,361	32.9	−10.6
Majority		17	0.4	−5.7
Turnout		2,752 (est)	90.4 (est)	+4.2
Registered electors		3,044		
Whig hold		Swing	+5.6	
Whig hold		Swing	+5.1	

General election 1841: Preston (2 seats)
Party	Candidate	Votes	%	±%
Whig	Peter Hesketh-Fleetwood	1,655	28.5	−16.1
Whig	George Strickland	1,629	28.0	+2.5
Conservative	Robert Townley Parker	1,270	21.9	+7.0
Conservative	Charles Swainson	1,255	21.6	+6.7
Majority		359	6.1	−8.7
Turnout		2,905 (est)	86.2 (est)	c. −3.1
Registered electors		3,371		
Whig hold		Swing	−11.5	
Whig hold		Swing	−2.2	

=== Elections in the 1830s ===
General election 1837: Preston (2 seats)
Party	Candidate	Votes	%	±%
Whig	Peter Hesketh-Fleetwood	2,726	44.6	+28.4
Conservative	Robert Townley Parker	1,821	29.8	−3.9
Whig	John Crawfurd	1,562	25.5	+9.3
Radical	Feargus O'Connor	5	0.1	−33.7
Turnout		3,264	89.3	−0.4
Registered electors		3,656		
Majority		905	14.8	+3.8
Whig hold		Swing	+15.2	
Majority		259	4.3	+3.1
Conservative hold		Swing	−11.4	

General election 1835: Preston (2 seats)
Party	Candidate	Votes	%	±%
Conservative	Peter Hesketh-Fleetwood	2,165	33.7	+2.3
Whig	Henry Smith-Stanley	2,092	32.5	+2.0
Radical	Thomas Perronet Thompson	1,385	21.5	+2.5
Radical	Thomas Smith	789	12.3	−6.8
Turnout		3,350	89.7	+2.5
Registered electors		3,734		
Majority		73	1.2	−11.1
Conservative hold		Swing	+2.3	
Majority		707	11.0	−0.4
Whig hold		Swing	+2.1	

General election 1832: Preston (2 seats)
Party	Candidate	Votes	%
Tory	Peter Hesketh-Fleetwood	3,372	31.4
Whig	Henry Smith-Stanley	3,273	30.5
Radical	Henry Hunt	2,054	19.1
Radical	John Forbes	1,926	17.9
Radical	Charles John Crompton	118	1.1
Turnout		5,538	87.2
Registered electors		6,352	
Majority		1,318	12.3
Tory gain from Radical			
Majority		1,219	11.4
Whig hold			

General election 1831: Preston (2 seats)
Party	Candidate	Votes	%
Whig	John Wood	Unopposed	
Radical	Henry Hunt	Unopposed	
Whig hold			
Radical gain from Whig			

By-election, 17 December 1830: Preston
Party	Candidate	Votes	%	±%
Radical	Henry Hunt	3,730	52.4	+32.9
Whig	Edward Smith-Stanley	3,392	47.6	−32.9
Majority		338	4.8	N/A
Turnout		7,122		
Radical gain from Whig		Swing	+32.9	

- Caused by Smith-Stanley's appointment as Chief Secretary for Ireland

General election 1830: Preston
Party	Candidate	Votes	%	±%
Whig	Edward Smith-Stanley	2,996	44.8	
Whig	John Wood	2,389	35.7	
Radical	Henry Hunt	1,308	19.5	
Majority		1,081	16.2	
Turnout		c. 3,347		
Whig hold		Swing		
Whig hold		Swing		

=== Elections in the 1810s ===
General election 1818: Preston (2 seats)
Party	Candidate	Votes	%	±%
Tory	Samuel Horrocks	1,694	37.3	−2.4
Whig	Edmund Hornby	1,598	35.2	−4.2
Reformer	Peter Crompton	1,245	27.4	New
Majority		449	9.9	−8.9
Turnout		4,537		
Tory hold		Swing		
Whig hold		Swing		

General election 1812: Preston (2 seats)
Party	Candidate	Votes	%	±%
Tory	Samuel Horrocks	1,379	39.7	
Whig	Edmund Hornby	1,368	39.4	
Independent	Edward Hanson	727	20.9	
Majority		652	18.8	
Turnout		3,474		

== See also ==
- List of parliamentary constituencies in Lancashire
- 1915 Preston by-election
- 1929 Preston by-election
- 1936 Preston by-election
- 1940 Preston by-election
- 2000 Preston by-election

== Sources ==
- Robert Beatson, A Chronological Register of Both Houses of Parliament (London: Longman, Hurst, Res & Orme, 1807)
- D Brunton & D H Pennington, Members of the Long Parliament (London: George Allen & Unwin, 1954)
- Cobbett's Parliamentary history of England, from the Norman Conquest in 1066 to the year 1803 (London: Thomas Hansard, 1808)
- The Constitutional Year Book for 1913 (London: National Union of Conservative and Unionist Associations, 1913)
- F W S Craig, British Parliamentary Election Results 1832-1885 (2nd edition, Aldershot: Parliamentary Research Services, 1989)
- F W S Craig, British Parliamentary Election Results 1918-1949 (Glasgow: Political Reference Publications, 1969)
- Maija Jansson (ed.), Proceedings in Parliament, 1614 (House of Commons) (Philadelphia: American Philosophical Society, 1988)
- J E Neale, The Elizabethan House of Commons (London: Jonathan Cape, 1949)
- J Holladay Philbin, Parliamentary Representation 1832 - England and Wales (New Haven: Yale University Press, 1965)
- Henry Stooks Smith, The Parliaments of England from 1715 to 1847 (2nd edition, edited by FWS Craig - Chichester: Parliamentary Reference Publications, 1973)
