= Edward Mosley (MP for Preston) =

English lawyer and politician

Sir Edward Mosley (died 1638) was an English lawyer and politician who sat in the House of Commons between 1614 and 1624.

Mosley was the son of Sir Nicholas Mosley who was Lord Mayor of London in 1599. He was a barrister at-law and was appointed Attorney-General of the Duchy of Lancaster in 1614. In 1614, he was elected Member of Parliament (MP) for Preston. He was knighted in December 1614. He was re-elected MP for Preston in 1621 and in 1624.

Mosley was later of Rolleston Staffordshire. He died without issue in 1638.

Mosley was the brother of Rowland Mosley, of Hough, Staffordshire, whose son Edward inherited the Rolleston estate and was created baronet in 1640.

Parliament of England
| Preceded by Vincent Skinner; William Holte | Member of Parliament for Preston; 1621–1624; With: Henry Banister 1614; William Pooley 1621–1624; Sir William Hervey 1624 | Succeeded by Sir William Hervey; Henry Banister |
