= Sir William Tomlinson, 1st Baronet =

British politician

Tomlinson in 1895.

Sir William Edward Murray Tomlinson, 1st Baronet, DL (4 August 1838 – 17 December 1912) was an English lawyer, colliery owner and Conservative politician.

== Life ==
Tomlinson was born at Heysham House, in the Lancaster registration district in Lancashire, the eldest son of Thomas Tomlinson, barrister, of 3 Richmond Terrace, Whitehall and Heysham House. His mother, Sarah, was the only daughter of the Rev. Roger Mashiter of Bolton-le-Sands.

He was educated at Westminster School and matriculated at Christ Church, Oxford in 1856, graduating B.A. 1860, M.A. 1863. He was called to the Bar in 1865, at the Inner Temple. He was part owner of the Worsley Mesnes Colliery Company.

Tomlinson was elected as member of parliament for Preston in 1882, and held the seat until the 1906 General Election when the Tories lost both Preston seats on the free trade issue. In the 1900 election he was challenged unsuccessfully by Keir Hardie. It was announced that he would receive a baronetcy in the 1902 Coronation Honours list published on 26 June 1902 for the (subsequently postponed) coronation of King Edward VII, and on 24 July 1902 he was created a Baronet, of Richmond Terrace, Whitehall, in the city of Westminster, in the county of London. At the end of March 1903, Tomlinson was appointed a deputy lieutenant of Lancashire and from 1891 sat on the bench for the Amounderness Division.

Escutcheon of the Tomlinson baronets of Richmond Terrace

Winston Churchill was challenged to fisticuffs when he referred to Tomlinson as "a miserable old man".

== Last years ==
Tomlinson was confined to his house for the last two years of his life. On his death from a stroke at the age of 74 the baronetcy became extinct. His obituary described him as a Conservative of the old school, small and dapper, a man of considerable wealth, a strong friend of the Volunteer movement (he held the rank of Lieutenant Colonel) and an office holder in the Church of England.

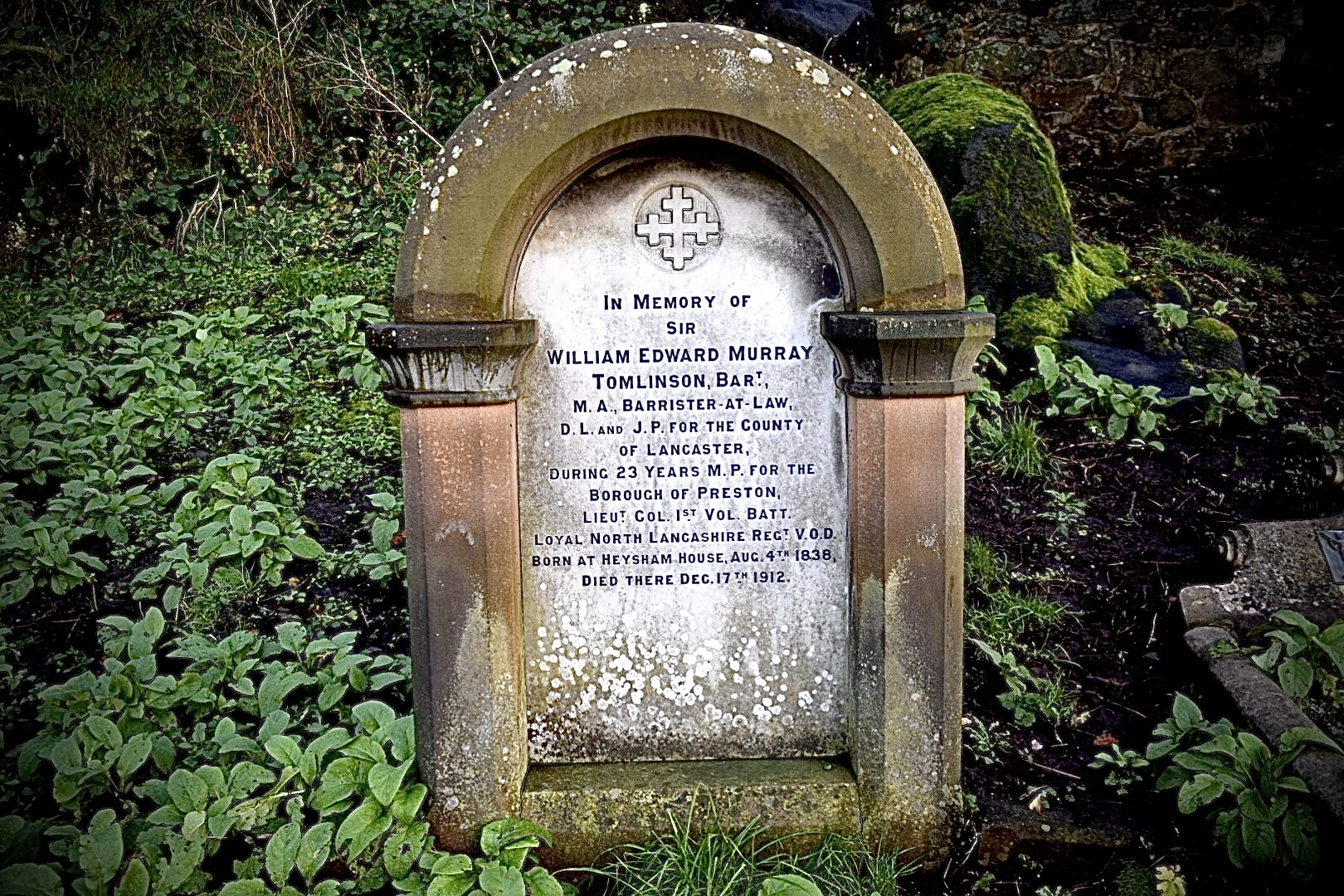
Grave of William Tomlinson MP

== Personal life and family ==
A twin, Tomlinson had a twin sister Ellen. She died on 6 January 1919. F. P. Tomlinson was his brother. He never married.

Tomlinson resided for his whole life in his two parental homes.

Parliament of the United Kingdom
Preceded by William Farrer Ecroyd; Henry Cecil Raikes	Member of Parliament for Preston; 1882–1906; With: William Farrer Ecroyd 1882–1885; Robert William Hanbury 1885–1903; John Kerr 1903–1906	Succeeded by John Thomas Macpherson; Harold Cox
Baronetage of the United Kingdom
New creation	Baronet (of Richmond Terrace); 1902–1912	Extinct
Preceded by Poynter baronets	Tomlinson baronets of Richmond Terrace; 24 July 1902	Succeeded by Treves baronets
