= List of Old Rossallians =

The List of Old Rossallians lists persons who attended or are associated with the Rossall School in Lancashire.

== Academia ==
- Peter Barton – First World War historian and author
- William Chawner – Vice Chancellor of the University of Cambridge 1899–1901
- John Standish Fforde – economist, historian and Chief Cashier at the Bank of England
- David Fowler – mathematician
- Robert James – High Master of St Paul's School and Headmaster of Harrow School
- Sir Henry Stuart Jones – classical scholar and lexicographer
- Charles Lethbridge Kingsford – historian and fellow of the British Academy
- Geoffrey Kirk – Regius Professor of Greek at Cambridge
- Hugh Trevor Lambrick - archaeologist, historian and administrator
- Dr John Morris – historian and founder of the historical journal Past & Present
- Charles Kay Ogden – linguist, psychologist and philosopher and inventor of Basic English
- Sir Isambard Owen – first Vice Chancellor of Bristol University and founder of The University of Wales
- Niall Shanks – philosopher

There have been many Old Rossallians who have become headmasters at public schools since its foundation in 1844, including Winchester College, Charterhouse School, Rugby School, Merchant Taylor's, Marlborough College, Cheltenham College, Dragon School, Wellington College, Harrow School, Malvern College, Dulwich College, Sevenoaks School and Christ's Hospital. The current crop includes the Headmasters at Bedales School and Shrewsbury School.

== Literary ==
- J. R. Ackerley – author, editor, and memoirist
- Leslie Charteris – creator of The Saint
- J. G. Farrell – novelist and winner of the Booker Prize
- R. Welldon Finn – historical writer
- F. W. Harvey, DCM – poet
- Raymond M. Patterson – explorer and travel writer
- Clive Phillipps-Wolley – author and big game hunter

== Media and television ==
- Michael Barratt – BBC TV Nationwide anchorman
- Patrick Campbell – team captain on Call My Bluff
- Sonny Flood – actor in Hollyoaks
- Davinia Taylor – actress and It Girl

== Military ==
- George Clarke, 1st Baron Sydenham of Combe – Governor of Bombay and Victoria
- Major General Ralph Arthur Penrhyn Clements – British Army general during the Second Boer War
- Field Marshal Sir Charles Comyn Egerton – First World War Field Marshal, member of the Council of the India, Commander of the Somaliland Field Force
- Edward Fitzherbert (CBE, DSO, MC) – British Army general
- Colonel Sir George Malcolm Fox, Inspector of Gymnasia and sword designer
- Air Commodore Robert Groves – Deputy Chief of the Air Staff
- VC Captain George S. Henderson (VC)
- General Sir Thomas Hutton, (KCB, KCIE, MC)
- Wing Commander Ronald Gustave Kellet – Second World War flying ace
- Frederick Lugard (GCMG, CB, DSO, PC) – governor of Hong Kong and Nigeria and founder of the University of Hong Kong
- Air Chief Marshal Sir Charles Edward Hasting Medhurst (KCB OBE MC) – Director of Allied Air Co-Operation (1940) and key figure in the RAF throughout the Second World War
- General John Nixon – First World War General
- Sir Charles Noble Arden-Clarke – Colonial Governor, last Governor of the Gold Coast
- VC Brigadier George Rowland Patrick Roupell (VC)
- Erroll Chunder Sen – First World War Indian aviator
- Vice Admiral Sir David Steel – Second Sea Lord

== Miscellaneous ==
- Sir Alexander Carmichael Bruce – Assistant Commissioner of Police of the Metropolis
- Sir Norman Kendal – Assistant Commissioner of Police of the Metropolis and Barrister
- Rachel Lomax – Deputy Governor of the Bank of England (Rossall Junior School)
- Lee Rudi Wood- CEO of Beyond Safety Consultants (Rossall Junior School)

== Music and the arts ==
Sir Thomas Beecham

- David Ambrose (Musician, Artist, Manager, Record producer) | David Ambrose]]
- Bill Ashton – founder of the National Youth Jazz Orchestra
- Sir Thomas Beecham – conductor and founder of numerous orchestras including the London Philharmonic and Royal Philharmonic
- Anthony Besch – opera director
- Little Boots (Victoria Hesketh) – singer/songwriter
- James Donald – actor (The Great Escape, The Bridge on the River Kwai)
- Robert Hamer - film director (Kind Hearts and Coronets)
- Bill Hopkins – composer, pianist and music critic
- Christopher Whall – founder of the New England School of Stained Glass craftsmanship. Helped William Morris establish the William Morris Arts and Crafts Society.

== Politics and law ==
- Edward Colborne Baber – colonial administrator (Rossall Junior School)
- Eric Alfred George Shackleton Bailey – Conservative MP for Manchester Gorton 1931–1935
- Robert Bernays – Liberal MP for Bristol North 1931–1945, Parliamentary Secretary to the Ministry of Health 1937–1939, Parliamentary Secretary to the Ministry of Transport 1939–1940
- Arthur John Bigge, 1st Baron Stamfordham Private Secretary to Queen Victoria (1895–1901) and to George V (1910–1931)
- Bertie Bolton – Chief Constable of Northamptonshire Constabulary (1941–1960)
- Harry Brittain – Conservative MP for Acton 1918-1929 and founder of the Pilgrims Society
- Wilfred Banks Duncan Brown, Baron of Machrihanish – Minister of State at the Board of Trade 1970–1975 and member of the Privy Council
- Alfred Broughton – long-serving Labour MP, central to the Labour government downfall in 1979
- Milne Cheetham – diplomatic minister to Switzerland, Greece and Denmark
- Octavius Leigh Clare – Conservative MP for Eccles 1895–1906
- Sir Robert Francis Dunnell – solicitor, civil servant and railway executive
- Sir Hugh Forbes – British High Court Judge 1970–1985
- Sir Herbert Brent Grotrian, 1st Baronet – Unionist MP for South-West Hull 1924–1929
- Sir Henry Hoyle Howorth – barrister, author, Fellow of the Royal Society and Conservative MP for Salford South 1886–1900
- Pedro Pablo Kuczynski - 66th President of the Republic of Peru who had to leave due to corruption.
- Edgar Ord Laird – British High Commissioner to Brunei 1963–1965
- Neil Marten – Conservative MP for Banbury 1959–1983 and Minister for Overseas Development 1979–1983
- C. H. Mullan – Conservative MP for Down 1946–1950
- Oswald Partington, 2nd Baron Doverdale – Liberal MP 1900–1918
- Robert Frederick Ratcliff – MP for Burton 1900–1918
- William Rolleston – cabinet minister in New Zealand, and later Leader of the Opposition
- Walter Dorling Smiles – MP for Blackburn 1931–1945; later for Down 1945–1950 and for Down, North 1950–1953
- John Ellis Talbot – Conservative MP for Brierley Hill 1959–1967
- Walter Topping – Northern Irish Minister of Home Affairs
- George Frederic Verdon (KCMG) – Treasurer of Australia
- Derek Colclough Walker-Smith – Conservative MP for Hertford 1945–1955 and then for East Hertfordshire 1955–1983; Minister of Health
- Ralph Champneys Williams – Governor of Newfoundland
- Colonel Sir Charles Edward Yate – Conservative MP for Melton 1918–1924
- Robert Armstrong Yerburgh – Unionist MP for Chester 1886–1906 and 1910–1916

== Religion ==
- Father Thomas R. D. Byles – Catholic priest who refused to leave the Titanic, in order to help fellow passengers. He perished as it sank.
- William Henry Temple Gairdner – missionary
- John Maurice Key – Bishop of Truro and Bishop of Sherborne
- Martin Patrick Grainge Leonard – Bishop of Thetford
- Mark Green – Bishop of Aston
- John Edward Mercer – Bishop of Tasmania
- William Moore Richardson – Bishop of Zanzibar
- Bryan Robin – Bishop of Adelaide
- George Sinker – Christian Missionary in India
- Wilfrid Lewis Mark Way – Bishop of Masasi
- Alwyn Williams – Bishop of Oxford, Durham and Winchester, chaplain to George V, prelate of the Order of the Garter, headmaster of Winchester College, and Dean of Christ Church

== Science, medicine and engineering ==
- Sir William de Wiveleslie Abney – astronomer, chemist and photographer
- John Fleetwood Baker – civil engineer and designer of the Morrison indoor shelter
- William Blair-Bell – co-founder of the Royal College of Obstetricians and Gynaecologists
- David Brown – engineer, entrepreneur and one-time owner of Aston Martin; his initials are still given to the finest models of Aston Martin cars. He also owned Lagonda.
- Sir Frederick Brundrett – Chief Scientific adviser to the Ministry of Defence 1954–1960
- Professor Sir William Boyd Dawkins – geologist, archaeologist and fellow of The Royal Society
- George Garrett – clergyman and submarine designer
- Francis Graham-Smith – Astronomer Royal
- Dikran Tahta – maths teacher who inspired Stephen Hawking
- John Turtle Wood – architect, engineer and archaeologist

== Sport ==
- Tom Atcheson – Northern Ireland international footballer
- Rex Crummack – 1920 Olympic gold medal winning hockey player
- Liam Botham – rugby union, rugby league and cricket player
- Walter Clopton Wingfield – the "inventor of lawn tennis"
- Paul Dalglish – football player (son of Kenny Dalglish)
- Michael Dickinson – world record holding National Hunt trainer
- Lewis Dingle – cricketer for Oxford University
- Jacob Draper - Olympic hockey player
- Harry Goodwin – cricketer for Gloucestershire
- Thomas Higson – cricketer for Derbyshire and Lancashire, and England test selector
- Nigel Howard – last amateur England cricket captain
- Francis Inge – cricketer
- John Inge – cricketer
- Roland Ingram-Johnson – cricketer
- Arthur Irvin – cricketer
- Nick Köster – rugby player (attended Rossall as an exchange student for one year, 2005–2006)
- Ham Lambert – Irish international cricketer, rugby player and referee
- Chris Leck – rugby union player
- Geoffrey Marsland – cricketer
- Philip Morton (1857–1925) – cricketer
- Henry Power (1897–1963) – cricketer
- Brian Redman – Formula 5000 champion
- Vernon Royle – England test cricketer
- Charles Eastlake Smith – footballer, played for England in 1876
- William Townshend – cricketer
- Benjamin Spilsbury – 19th-century England international footballer
- Geoffrey Plumpton Wilson (1878–1934), England international footballer
- Peter Winterbottom – England rugby union captain; also played for the Lions

== Notable parents of Rossall students ==
- Jamil al-Assad – Syrian politician
- Ian Botham – cricketer
- Carl Brisson – silent film actor
- Kenny Dalglish – football manager
- Syd Little – comedian
- Sir Frank Whittle – inventor of the jet engine
- Bruno Labaddia - football manager

== Notable masters ==
- John Ambrose Fleming – inventor
- Walter Besant – novelist and historian
- Warin Foster Bushell – President of the Mathematical Association
- Robert Clayton – 19th-century England and Yorkshire cricketer
- Harry Dean – cricketer (coach at Rossall)
- Jack Ellis – rugby player
- Paul Grice – philosopher
- John Eldon Gorst – politician
- S. P. B. Mais – author and journalist
- Rupert Morris – clergyman, antiquarian and chaplain to the Duke of Westminster
- John Rees – Welsh rugby international
- Owen Seaman – poet, journalist and editor of Punch
- Thomas Llewellyn Thomas – scholar of the Welsh language
- George Utley – England international and twice FA Cup winner, assistant cricket coach from 1911 to 1931

== Notable Council Members ==
- Spencer Cavendish, 8th Duke of Devonshire – Leader of the Liberal Party; later Leader of the Conservative Party in the House of Lords
- Walter Clegg – Conservative MP
- Wilbraham Egerton, 1st Earl Egerton – landowner and MP
- Robert Ladds – Bishop of Whitby
- William Temple – Archbishop of Canterbury
- Edward Henry Stanley – 15th Earl of Derby and Foreign Secretary (son of Edward Smith-Stanley, 14th Earl of Derby and Prime Minister)
- Frederick Arthur Stanley – 16th Earl of Derby, notable for donating the Stanley Cup
- John Woolley – first Principal of the University of Sydney
- Every Earl of Derby since the 15th Earl of Derby has been President of the Corporation of Rossall School

== Fictional ==
- Dan Dare
