= Edward Fitzherbert =

Edward Fitzherbert may refer to:

- Edward Fitzherbert (British Army officer) (1885–1979), British Army officer and cricketer
- Edward Fitzherbert, 13th Baron Stafford (1864–1941), English peer and Royal Navy officer
