= Herbert Hollings =

English cricketer and barrister

Personal information
- Full name: Herbert John Butler Hollings
- Born: 18 June 1855; Manningham, Yorkshire, England
- Died: 6 March 1922 (aged 66); Bournemouth, Hampshire, England
- Batting: Right-handed
- Bowling: Right-arm off break

Domestic team information
- Years: Team
- 1877: Oxford University

Career statistics
| Competition | First-class |
|---|---|
| Matches | 1 |
| Runs scored | 0 |
| Batting average | 0.00 |
| 100s/50s | –/– |
| Top score | 0 |
| Catches/stumpings | –/– |
- Source: Cricinfo, 13 May 2020

Herbert John Butler Hollings JP (18 June 1855 – 6 March 1922) was an English first-class cricketer and barrister.

The son of John Hollings, he was born in June 1855 at Manningham, Yorkshire. He was educated at Winchester College, before going up to Corpus Christi College, Oxford. While studying at Oxford, he made a single appearance in first-class cricket for Oxford University against the Marylebone Cricket Club at Oxford in 1877. Batting twice in the match, he was dismissed without scoring in both Oxford innings' by Fred Morley and Robert Clayton respectively.

A student of the Inner Temple, he was called to the bar in 1881. He became a justice of the peace for Surrey in 1884. Hollings married Nine Augusta Stacey in 1886, with the couple having a son who was killed in the First World War. He died at Bournemouth in March 1922.
