= Rossall =

Suburb of Fleetwood, Lancashire, England

Coordinates: 53.898°N 3.039°W

- Shown within Wyre Borough Shown on the Fylde Location within Lancashire
- District: Wyre
- Shire county: Lancashire
- Region: North West
- Country: England
- Sovereign state: United Kingdom
- Post town: FLEETWOOD
- Postcode district: FY7
- Dialling code: 01253
- Police: Lancashire
- Fire: Lancashire
- Ambulance: North West
- UK Parliament: Blackpool North and Fleetwood

Rossall is a settlement in Lancashire, England and a suburb of the market town of Fleetwood. It is situated on a coastal plain called The Fylde. Blackpool Tramway runs through Rossall, with two stations: Rossall School on Broadway and Rossall Square on South strand.

== Early history ==
Before the Norman conquest of England of 1066, the manor of Rossall was—as part of the ancient hundred of Amounderness—in the possession of Earl Tostig, the brother of King Harold II. In the Domesday Book of 1086, the manor was listed as Rushale, and in later documents as Rossall (1212) and Roshale (1228). In 1086, the area of Rossall was assessed at two carucates of land.

King John gave the estate to Dieulacres Abbey in Staffordshire in 1206. Later in the 13th century, the moiety of Little Bispham and Norbreck was added to the estate. The abbot of Dieulacres leased Rossall to George Allen, who was a relative of his. The Allens, a prominent Roman Catholic family, occupied the manor until the Dissolution of the Monasteries in the 16th century. Cardinal William Allen was born at Rossall in 1532. Dieulacres Abbey was dissolved in the 1530s and Rossall was sold to Thomas Fleetwood. Later, when George Allen's grandson Richard died, Thomas Fleetwood's son Edmund evicted Richard's widow and daughters, and they went to live with Richard's brother, Cardinal Allen.

== Rossall Hall ==
In 1733, Margaret Fleetwood, heiress to the Rossall estate, married Roger Hesketh of North Meols and Tulketh Hall, bringing Rossall into the Hesketh family. The couple chose to live at Rossall and it is likely that Roger Hesketh built the hall that existed into the 20th century. Previous houses on the estate were said to have been eroded or swept away by the sea. A chart drawn for Hesketh in 1737 shows a ruined "Old Rossall" slightly north of Rossall Hall.

According to John Martin Robinson in A Guide to the Country Houses of the North West, the 18th century hall was a "great rambling whitewashed house", with irregular wings. By the 19th century, it had five family bedrooms, nursery rooms, a drawing room, dining room, libraries and an organ room, as well as servant accommodation and service rooms. The grounds included a workshop, four stables, a shippon, a coach house, an ice house and a gazebo.

By the 1830s, the house and estate was in the ownership of Edmund's descendant Peter Hesketh, High Sheriff of the County of Lancashire and MP for Preston, who later changed his name to (Sir) Peter Hesketh-Fleetwood. By 1844, Hesketh had run into serious financial difficulties. He had engaged Frederick Kemp as his agent and the two had considerable financial differences of opinion. Kemp borrowed against the estate revenues to finance the expansion of Fleetwood, and Hesketh became over-leveraged. He was obliged to sell much of the estate, together with Rossall Hall itself. The Hall was taken over by Rev. St. Vincent Beechey and converted into a Church of England boarding school, designed as a Northern equivalent of Beechey's Marlborough College and later to become Rossall School.

== Geography and administration ==
Rossall is located in the south-west of Fleetwood along the coast with Thornton-Cleveleys to the south. Rossall is in the Lancaster and Fleetwood constituency. Rossall ward is one of five local council wards in Fleetwood. An electoral ward in the same name exists. This ward stretches north to include part of Fleetwood with a total population taken at the 2011 census of 6,381.

== Rossall School ==
Rossall School is the most prominent school in Fleetwood., The school is a co-educational, independent, day and boarding school catering to ages 5 to 18. It was founded in 1844 on the site of Rossall Hall by Rev. St Vincent Beechey.

== Notable people ==
- Cardinal William Allen - born 1532 and died on 16 October 1594. He was an English Roman Catholic priest and cardinal.
- Peter Hesketh-Fleetwood - founder of the town of Fleetwood, and lived at Rossall Hall.
- See also List of Old Rossallians

== See also ==
- Cleveleys
- Thornton, Lancashire
