= Henry Daniel (classicist) =

English classicist and clergyman (1836–1919)

The Reverend C. H. O. Daniel
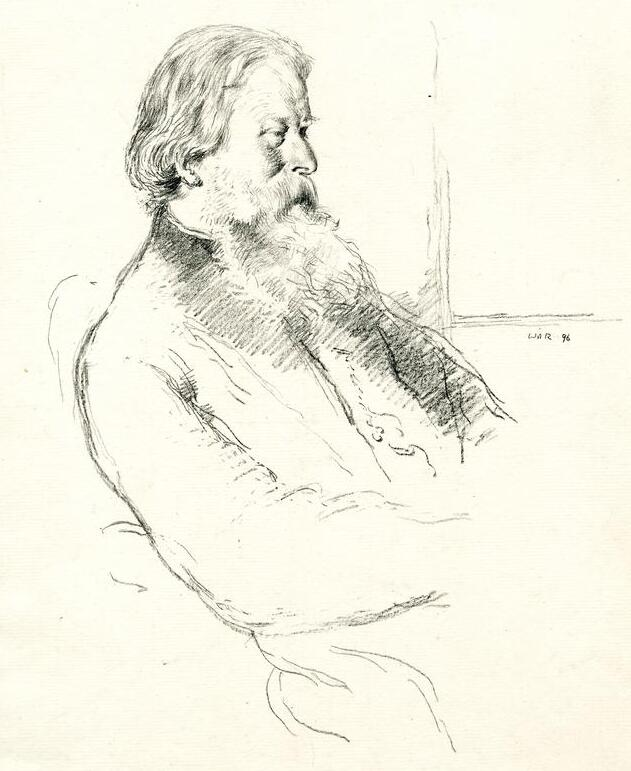
- The Reverend C. Henry Daniel, 1896

Provost of Worcester College, Oxford
- In office 1903–1919
- Preceded by: William Inge
- Succeeded by: Francis John Lys

Personal details
- Born: Charles Henry Olive Daniel; 30 September 1836 Wareham, Dorset, England
- Died: 6 September 1919 (aged 82)
- Spouse: Emily (m. 1878)
- Children: 2
- Education: King's College School
- Alma mater: Worcester College, Oxford

Charles Henry Olive Daniel (30 September 1836 – 6 September 1919) was a British classicist, Anglican clergyman and printer. Having been a lecturer in classics at King's College, London, he was elected a fellow of Worcester College, Oxford in 1863. He was ordained as a deacon in the Church of England in 1864 and went on to serve his college as a tutor, bursar and chaplain. He was elected provost of Worcester College in 1903, serving until his death in 1919. In 1874, he also established the Daniel Press, a private press.

== Early life and education ==
Daniel was born on 30 September 1836 in Wareham, Dorset, England, as the eldest son of the Reverend Alfred Daniel and Eliza Anne (née Cruttwell). As a baby, he was presented to the then Princess Victoria, the year before she became Queen of the United Kingdom. Two years after his birth, his father was appointed perpetual curate of Frome, Somerset, and it was there that he spent the rest of his childhood. He was educated at Grosvenor College, Bath, and King's College School, London. He learnt how to use the family's Ruthven printing press as a child, and took it with him when he went to university. In 1854, aged only 17, he was awarded a scholarship to Worcester College, Oxford, to study Literae humaniores (i.e. classics). He graduated from the University of Oxford with a first class honours Bachelor of Arts (BA) degree 1858. He was a prominent member of the Oxford Union and was elected its librarian for 1859. HIn 1904, he was awarded the Doctor of Divinity (DD) degree by the University of Oxford.

== Career ==
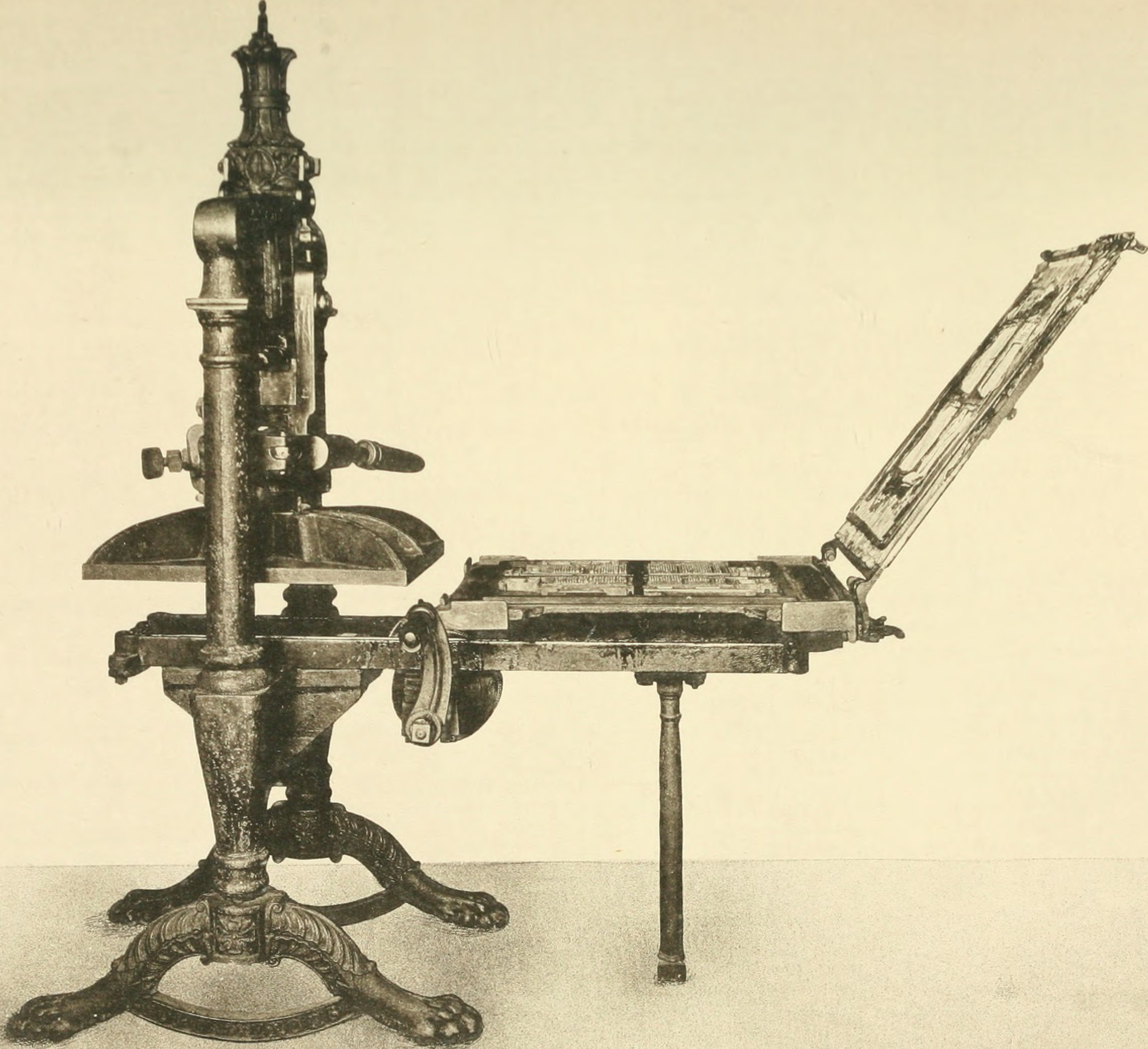
The Albion press as used by the Daniel Press, which was gifted to the Bodleian Library after Daniel's death

In 1859, Daniel joined King's College, London, as a lecturer in classical literature. However, in 1863, he was elected to a fellow of his alma mater Worcester College and so he left London to return to the University of Oxford. He brought an early Albion press with him to his new rooms in Oxford. He was ordained as a deacon in the Church of England either in London before he returned to Oxford or in 1864. His religious views were latitudinarian, rather than the Tractarianism that flourished at Oxford nor the anti-ritualist intolerance that sprung up against it. In addition to being a classical tutor, he held a number of college offices: he became dean of chapel in 1865, the vice-provost in 1866, and junior bursar in 1870. He also served the University of Oxford; as proctor in 1873 and as the classical examiner from 1876 to 1877. In 1882, following the death of Henry Coxe, he was a candidate for the post of Bodley's Librarian, but the post went to Edward Nicholson, a professional librarian. In 1903, the first year that the fellows of Worcester College had the power to elect their own provost, Daniel was chosen by he colleagues to head the college. During the First World War, he kept the college chapel open and maintained "its services unbroken". He led the college until his death in 1919.

== Personal life ==
In 1878, Daniel married Emily Olive (1852–1933), his first cousin and daughter of Edmund Crabb Olive. Together they had two daughters; Rachel (1880–1937) and Ruth (1884–1961).

Daniel died on 6 September 1919 at his country house in Oddington, Gloucestershire. He is buried in Holywell Cemetery, Oxford.

The Daniel Press was inherited by Daniel's nephew, Henry Martin Daniel (1888–1955), who used it to print and publish his own His Majesty's Valiants: Being a Short Account of Valiant Deeds Accomplished by the King's and Queen's Ships of that Name Between the Years 1759 and 1922 in 1923, to Emily Daniel's chagrin. H. M. Daniel, a Royal Navy officer, was famously court-martialled in the Royal Oak affair of 1928 and subsequently worked as a journalist.

Academic offices
Preceded by William Inge	Provost of Worcester College, Oxford; 1903 to 1919	Succeeded by Francis John Lys
