= Gabrielle Lambrick =

British historian, educator and civil servant

Gabrielle Margaret Lambrick

Gabrielle Margaret Lambrick MA, FRHist Soc (23 August 1913 – 14 August 1968) was a British senior civil servant, educator and historian. After a distinguished career in the civil service during World War II she married and became a historian on medieval Abingdon in Oxfordshire and its environs. She was elected a Fellow of the Royal Historical Society in 1967.

== Early life ==
She was born in Wandsworth in London in 1913, the daughter of Isabel Evelyn née Henderson and Herbert Henry Jennings, a hospital administrator and art collector. As a young girl she became proficient at the piano. She attended Clapham High School before studying at the Royal College of Music (RCM) where she gained her Licentiate (LRCM) in 1932. She after learned to play the viola. On leaving the RCM in 1932 she went up to Girton College, Cambridge where she read history under the medieval historian, Helen Cam. In 1936 at Cambridge she received a postgraduate Certificate in Education and embarked on a career in teaching. From 1936 to 1937 she was living at Battersea in London and from 1937 to 1939 she had moved to Hove in Sussex while she taught history and current affairs at Brighton Girls. Here she was also the school librarian and helped with sporting, dramatic and musical events. Her plans to teach music at the school were halted by the outbreak of World War II when the school was evacuated.

== Career ==
She began war service with the Treasury where she was soon noticed for her efficiency. In 1942 she was appointed private secretary to Ralph Assheton, the new Financial Secretary to the Treasury. At the end of the war she was appointed principal in the Overseas Finance Section which lead to her taking part in delegations to Washington, Berlin and Vienna. During March to April 1947 she was a member of the British delegation at the fourth meeting of the Council of Foreign Ministers in Moscow, but by this time the Cold War was gathering pace and they failed to agree on a peace treaty for Germany and Austria. In 1948 at Kensington in London she married the civil servant, historian and academic Hugh Trevor Lambrick. The couple moved to Boars Hill near Abingdon in Oxfordshire where they had two sons: Charles Trevor Lambrick (born 1949), a solicitor; and George Hugh Lambrick (born 1952), an archaeologist.

From about 1959 Gabrielle Lambrick began her own research into the history of Abingdon which included writing a well-received guidebook to St. Peter’s church in Wootton (1964). At this time she discovered that the two surviving cartularies of Abingdon Abbey, one of the leading Benedictine monasteries of medieval England, were as yet unpublished. She devoted the rest of her life to this project with the support of Helen Cam and other eminent historians of medieval England including Vivian Hunter Galbraith and William Abel Pantin. By the time of her death in 1968 these remained unpublished until they were picked up in 1982 by Cecil Slade, a medieval historian and the head of archaeology at the University of Reading who completed her work leading to their publication by the Oxford Historical Society in 1990 and 1992.

Between 1960 and 1968 Lambrick published a number of articles about Abingdon and its environs in Oxoniensia; The English Historical Review; The Journal of Ecclesiastical History, and in Medieval Archaeology. In 1966 the Friends of Abingdon published her booklet, The Business Affairs of Abingdon Abbey, while in 1967 she was elected a Fellow of the Royal Historical Society. As a member of the Friends of Abingdon she campaigned against the redevelopment of Abingdon and against putting a road through the historic site of Abingdon Abbey. She represented the Friends of Abingdon on the Council for British Archaeology. In 1968 she was one of the founders the Abingdon and District Archaeological Society, later known as the Abingdon Area Archaeological and Historical Society. The Society holds an annual lecture in her memory and she among the Abingdon historians who have been honoured with having streets named after them, in her case Lambrick Way, in the Caldecott area of Abingdon.

Gabrielle Lambrick died in 1968 at Abingdon in Oxfordshire. In her will she left an estate valued at £34,896.

== Selected publications ==
=== Books ===
- Lambrick, Gabrielle Margaret. The Church of Saint Peter, Wootton, Berkshire. Illustrated guide, Abingdon : Abbey Press, 1964
- Lambrick, Gabrielle Margaret. Business Affairs at Abingdon Abbey in Mediaeval Times, Abingdon, (Berks.) : Friends of Abingdon, 1966
- Lambrick, Gabrielle and Slade, C. F. (eds) Two cartularies of Abingdon Abbey Vol. I, [Oxford] : Oxford Historical Society. 1990
- Lambrick, Gabrielle and Slade, C. F. (eds) Two cartularies of Abingdon Abbey Vol. II, [Oxford] : Oxford Historical Society. 1992

=== Articles ===
- Lambrick, Gabrielle. Abingdon and the Riots of 1327, Oxoniensia, Oxfordshire Architectural and Historical Society, Vol. 29-30, (1964-1965)
- Lambrick, Gabrielle. Abingdon Abbey Administration, The Journal of Ecclesiastical History, 1966
- Lambrick, Gabrielle. The Impeachment of the Abbot of Abingdon in 1368, The English Historical Review, Volume LXXXII, Issue CCCXXIII, April 1967, Pages 250–276
