= Hugh Forbes =

British judge (1917–1985)

Sir Hugh Harry Valentine Forbes (14 February 1917 – 13 December 1985) was a British barrister and High Court judge from 1970 until his death in 1985.

Forbes was the son of the Rev. H. N. Forbes, sometime Rector of Castle Bromwich. He was educated at Rossall School and Trinity Hall, Cambridge, where he took a First in Law. During the Second World War, he served in the Gordon Highlanders and as GSO2 at the War Office and GHQ India. Demobilized with the rank of Major, he was called to the Bar by the Middle Temple in 1946. He was appointed a Queen's Counsel in 1966 and was elected a Bencher of the Middle Temple in 1970.

He was appointed to the High Court of Justice in 1970, received the customary knighthood, and was assigned to the Queen's Bench Division. He was deputy chairman of the Huntingdon and Peterborough quarter sessions from 1965 to 1967 and the Lincolnshire (Kesteven) quarter sessions from 1967 to 1971, having been deputy chairman from 1961 to 1967. He was an Additional Judge on the Employment Appeal Tribunal from 1976 to 1982 and a member of the Parole Board from 1977 to 1979, being vice-chairman from 1978 to 1979.

He was Chancellor of the Diocese of Ely from 1965 to 1969, of the Diocese of Chelmsford in 1969, and was a member of the Court of Ecclesiastical Causes Reserved from 1985 until his death. Outside of the law, he was chairman of the council of the Royal Yachting Association from 1971 to 1976.
