= Francis Inge =

English cricketer and clergyman

Personal information
- Full name: Francis George Inge
- Born: 27 June 1840; Ravenstone, Leicestershire, England
- Died: 22 September 1923 (aged 83); Oxford, Oxfordshire, England
- Relatives: William Inge (brother); John Inge (brother); Will Inge (nephew)

Domestic team information
- Years: Team
- 1861–1863: Oxford University

Career statistics
Competition	First-class
Matches	9
Runs scored	233
Batting average	19.41
100s/50s	0/1
Top score	57
Balls bowled	458
Wickets	24
Bowling average	10.85
5 wickets in innings	2
10 wickets in match	0
Best bowling	5/50
Catches/stumpings	6/–
- Source: Cricinfo, 9 February 2020

Francis George Inge (27 June 1840 – 22 September 1923) was an English first-class cricketer and clergyman.

The son of Charles Inge, he was born in June 1840 at Ravenstone, Leicestershire. He was educated firstly at Rossall School in 1851–52, before attending Charterhouse School.

Matriculating at Christ Church, Oxford in 1859, Inge graduated B.A. in 1864, M.A. in 1865. While studying at Oxford he played first-class cricket for Oxford University, making his debut against the Marylebone Cricket Club at Oxford in 1861. He played first-class cricket for Oxford until 1863, making a total of nine appearances. A versatile all-round cricketer, he scored 233 runs at an average of 19.41 and with a high score of 57. As a bowler, he took 24 wickets at a bowling average of 10.25. His best bowling figures were 5 for 50, one of two five wicket hauls he took.

After graduating from Oxford, he was employed at Charterhouse School as an assistant master in 1864–5. He took holy orders in the Church of England in 1865, where he held various curacies up to 1881. He was the vicar of Elmton, Derbyshire from 1881–4, before becoming the vicar of Baswich, Staffordshire. Inge died at Oxford in September 1923.
