= Francis Dunnell =

English solicitor, civil servant, and railway executive

Sir Francis Dunnell Bt KCB JP
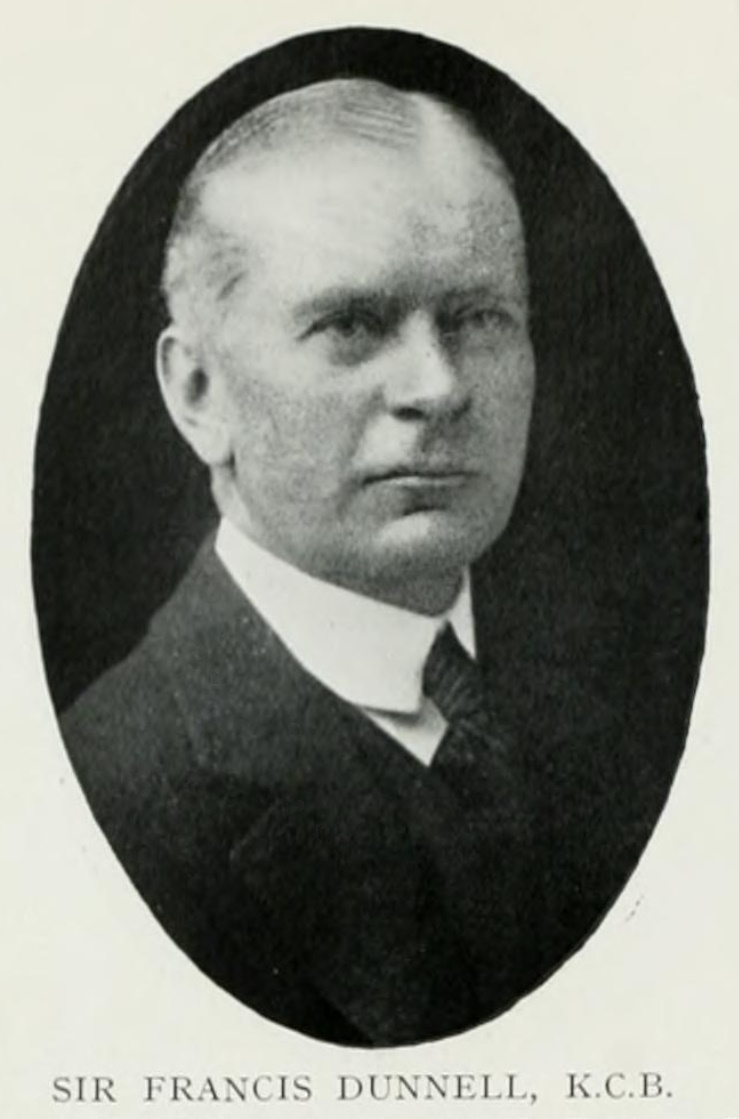
- Photographic portrait, c. 1922

Chief Legal Adviser and Solicitor to the London and North Eastern Railway Company
- In office 1922–1928

Secretary to the Ministry of Transport
- In office September 1919 – September 1921

Secretary, Demobilisation Section, War Cabinet
- In office 1918–1919

Additional Assistant Secretary to the Admiralty
- In office 1917–1918

Solicitor to the North Eastern Railway Company
- In office 1905–1917

Personal details
- Born: Robert Francis Dunnell; 26 July 1868 Bury St Edmunds, Suffolk, England
- Died: 16 July 1960 (aged 91) Nairobi, Kenya

Sir Robert Francis Dunnell, 1st Baronet, KCB, JP (26 July 1868 – 16 July 1960) was an English solicitor, civil servant and railway executive.

In the decade before World War I, Dunnell was in charge of the legal department and company secretary of the North Eastern Railway Company (NER). From 1917, his services were lent to the government, serving in the Admiralty and a Naval Mission to the United States. In the post-war years Dunnell was secretary of the demobilisation section of the War Cabinet, after which he was appointed for two years to the newly-formed Ministry of Transport during its post-war establishment period. In September 1921, Dunnell returned to the North Eastern Railway Company, which was afterwards subsumed into the London and North Eastern Railway Company (LNER) (to which he was appointed chief legal adviser). He resigned from the LNER in 1928 and two years later was appointed as a Railway and Canal Commissioner. Dunnell went to live in Nairobi in 1947, where he died in 1960.

== Early life, education and pre-war career ==
Dunnell was born on 26 July 1868 at Bury St Edmunds in Suffolk, the third son of Robert Dunnell and Harriet (née Smith). He was educated at the Rossall School.

In December 1890, Dunnell was admitted, with honours, to the roll of solicitors of the Supreme Court. In 1891, he joined the staff of the solicitor's department of the North Eastern Railway Company (NER). He was appointed a justice of the peace of York. Dunnell was appointed assistant solicitor to the North Eastern Railway in 1900. In 1905, he was appointed solicitor to the NER and in the following year also took on the role of company secretary.

Dunnell and Ruby Garrett were married in 1897. The couple had no children. Ruby died in 1901 after only four years of marriage.

== World War I ==
After the outbreak of World War I, the government taking wartime control of the railway system, and in 1917 Dunnell's services were lent to the government. He was appointed as an additional assistant secretary to the Admiralty. He served as secretary to the British Naval Mission led by Sir Eric Geddes, who had been Dunnell's colleague at the North Eastern Railway, that travelled to the United States in October 1918. The purpose of the mission was to consult with the US government regarding measures to be adopted to counter the heavy losses of Allied shipping by German submarines.

At the end of the war, Dunnell was appointed secretary of the demobilisation section of the War Cabinet, again working under Geddes. After the establishment of the Ministry of Transport in September 1919, the directors of the North Eastern Railway consented to Dunnell's temporary transfer to the ministry for two years during "the period of control". He was appointed first secretary and solicitor to the newly-formed ministry, under Geddes as the first Minister of Transport.

In April 1919, Dunnell was appointed Knight Commander of the Order of the Bath (KCB) "in recognition of his services during the war". In December 1921, it was announced that he would be created a baronet for his services to the Ministry of Transport during the period of post-war work, to take effect from 11 January 1922.

== Post-war ==
Dunnell resigned from the Ministry of Transport in September 1921 and returned to York to resume his position as secretary and solicitor to the North Eastern Railway Company. In 1921, Dunnell's old company, the North Eastern Railway, along with six other railway companies, was subsumed under the Railways Act 1921 legislation into the London and North Eastern Railway Company (LNER). In late 1922, Dunnell was appointed chief legal adviser and solicitor to the amalgamated company.

In late June 1928, Dunnell led the legal team representing the London and North Eastern Railway Company at the commencement of the coronial inquest into the Darlington train collision. The accident occurred on the night of 27 June 1928 at Darlington railway station in County Durham, when a parcel train collided head-on with an excursion train on the same track, causing the deaths of 25 people and the serious injury of over 50 more.

Dunnell retired from LNER in late 1928. In April 1930, he was appointed a Railway and Canal Commissioner. In December 1930, Dunnell was one of seven appointments on a panel of arbitrators for the settlement of disputes under the Central Coal Mines Scheme.

In 1947, Dunnell went to live in Nairobi, the capital of Kenya. He died there on 16 July 1960, aged 91. The baronetcy became extinct upon his death.

== Footnotes ==
Baronetage of the United Kingdom
New creation	Baronet (of York); 1922–1960	Extinct
