= Henry Power (cricketer) =

English cricketer and soldier

Personal information
- Full name: Henry Ross Power
- Born: 31 December 1897; Kensington, London, England
- Died: 12 May 1963 (aged 65); Cobham, Surrey, England
- Batting: Unknown
- Bowling: Unknown

Domestic team information
- Years: Team
- 1927/28: Europeans

Career statistics
Competition	First-class
Matches	2
Runs scored	179
Batting average	59.66
100s/50s	1/–
Top score	136
Balls bowled	60
Wickets	1
Bowling average	43.00
5 wickets in innings	–
10 wickets in match	–
Best bowling	1/40
Catches/stumpings	1/–
- Source: Cricinfo, 25 December 2023

Henry Ross Power OBE DL (31 December 1897 – 12 May 1963) was an English first-class cricketer and an officer in the British Indian Army.

== Life and military career ==
The son of Kingsmill Power, he was born at Kensington in December 1897. Power was educated at Rossall School, after which he went to British India to attend the Cadet College at Wellington, graduating from there into the British Indian Army (BIA) as a second lieutenant in April 1916, which was nearly two years into the First World War. He was attached to the 37th Dogras, with whom promotion to lieutenant followed in April 1917. Following the end of the war, he was promoted to captain in April 1920. While serving in India, he made two appearances in first-class cricket for the Europeans cricket team. The first came for the Europeans against the Hindus at Lahore in 1927–28 Lahore Tournament, with his second coming for the Punjab Governor's XI against Northern India in March 1928; In the latter match, he scored a century with a score of 136.

Power was promoted to major in the BIA in April 1934, while in September of that year he was appointed to be an instructor at the Indian Military Academy. Having vacated his appointment as an instructor in August 1937, Power would go onto serve in the Second World War. During the war, he was promoted to lieutenant colonel in April 1942, Following the end of the war, he promoted to colonel in May 1947, antedated to April 1945. He retired from active service in September 1948, two years after the end of the war and just over a year after Indian Independence; the latter event resulting in his transfer to the special list of the British Army. After the end of his military career, he maintained a military association by being a member of the Territorial Army, with the 10th/11th Surrey Battalion. Power was made an Order of the British Empire in the 1956 Birthday Honours and was later appointed a deputy lieutenant for Surrey in September 1959. He was awarded the Cadet Forces Medal in September 1961, having resigned his commission in the TA in the same month.

Power died in May 1963 at Cobham, Surrey. He was married to Josephine Lesley St. John Wilson, the daughter of Henry Wilson, who was the Bishop of Chelmsford from 1929 to 1950.
