= John Inge (cricketer) =

English cricketer

Personal information
- Full name: John Walter Inge
- Born: 31 March 1839; Ashby-de-la-Zouch, Leicestershire, England
- Died: 9 January 1919 (aged 79); Oxford, Oxfordshire, England
- Relatives: Francis Inge (brother); William Inge (brother); Will Inge (great-nephew)

Career statistics
Competition	First-class
Matches	1
Runs scored	13
Batting average	6.50
100s/50s	0/0
Top score	9
Catches/stumpings	1/–
- Source: Cricinfo, 2 August 2020

John Walter Inge (31 March 1839 – 9 January 1919) was an English first-class cricketer and British Army officer.

The son of Charles Inge, he was born in March 1839 at Ashby-de-la-Zouch in Leicestershire. He was educated firstly at Rossall School until 1853, before attending Charterhouse School from 1853 to 1856. After completing his education, Inge was commissioned into the British Army as a lieutenant in the Royal Artillery in June 1860. Inge made a single appearance in first-class cricket for the Gentlemen of Kent against the Gentlemen of Marylebone Cricket Club at Canterbury in August 1863. Batting twice in the match, he was run out for 4 runs in the Gentlemen of Kent first innings, while in their second innings he was dismissed for 9 runs by George Milman.

Inge was promoted to captain in November 1872, with him later serving in the Second Anglo-Afghan War of 1878–80, during which he was decorated. He was promoted to major in February 1881, before gaining the rank of lieutenant colonel in September 1887. Having completed five years as a regimental lieutenant colonel, he was retired from active service in September 1892. Inge died at Hollywell Lodge in Oxford in January 1919. His brothers Francis and William both played first-class cricket, as did his great-nephew Will Inge.
