= Will Inge =

English cricketer

Personal information
- Full name: William Walter Inge
- Born: 29 November 1907; Holmwood, Surrey, England
- Died: 18 March 1991 (aged 83); Rugby, Warwickshire, England
- Batting: Right-handed
- Role: Wicket-keeper
- Relatives: Francis Inge (great-uncle); John Inge (great-uncle); William Inge (great-uncle)

Domestic team information
- Years: Team
- 1928–1955: Oxfordshire
- 1930: Oxford University
- 1930: Minor Counties

Career statistics
Competition	First-class
Matches	3
Runs scored	20
Batting average	10.00
100s/50s	0/0
Top score	9*
Catches/stumpings	2/4
- Source: Cricinfo, 6 May 2012

William Walter Inge (29 November 1907 – 18 March 1991) was an English cricketer. Inge was a right-handed batsman who fielded as a wicket-keeper.

Inge was born at Holmwood, Surrey, where his father, Rev. Charles Cuthbert Inge, was then vicar. Inge's grandfather was William Inge, Provost of Worcester College, Oxford; his uncle was William Ralph Inge, Dean of St Paul's Cathedral. His grandfather and two great-uncles (Francis Inge and John Inge) had all played first-class cricket.

Inge made his debut in county cricket for Oxfordshire against Cambridgeshire in the 1928 Minor Counties Championship. Three seasons later in 1930 while attending the University of Oxford, he made his first-class debut for Oxford University against Glamorgan at the University Parks, in what was his only first-class appearance for the university. In that same season he was selected to play for a combined Minor Counties team, making two first-class appearances against Wales at Penrhyn Avenue, Rhos-on-Sea, and Lancashire at Old Trafford. These two appearances bought him limited success, with 19 runs and behind the stumps a single catch and three stumpings. He continued to play Minor counties cricket for Oxfordshire prior to World War II, making 68 appearances. After the war he made a further 94 Minor Counties Championship appearances for Oxfordshire, playing his final match against Berkshire in 1955.

He died at Rugby, Warwickshire, on 18 March 1991.
