= Harry Goodwin (cricketer) =

Welsh cricketer (1870–1955)

Personal information
- Full name: Harry Smyth Goodwin
- Born: 30 September 1870; Merthyr Tydfil, Glamorgan, Wales
- Died: 13 November 1955 (aged 85); Christ's Hospital, Horsham, Sussex
- Batting: Right-handed
- Role: Batsman

Domestic team information
- Years: Team
- 1896–1907: Gloucestershire
- FC debut: 25 May 1896 Gloucestershire v Sussex
- Last FC: 22 August 1907 Gloucestershire v South Africans

Career statistics
Competition	First-class
Matches	31
Runs scored	546
Batting average	12.40
100s/50s	0/0
Top score	46
Catches/stumpings	20/–
- Source: CricketArchive, 24 April 2014

Harry Smyth Goodwin (30 September 1870 – 13 November 1955) was a cricketer of the nineteenth century, born in Glamorgan, Wales but playing for Gloucestershire between 1896 and 1907. A right-handed batsman, Goodwin was an alumnus of Rossall School in Lancashire, for whom he played two matches in 1889. He played 31 matches for Gloucestershire, though aside from the 1897 cricket season he often played only a small number of games each year. He scored 564 runs at a batting average of 12.40, and a best of 46. He was later President of Horsham Cricket Club.

== Playing career ==
=== Early life and cricket at Rossall ===
Goodwin was born in 1870 in Merthyr Tydfil, at the time a mining town for iron ore, coal and limestone in Glamorgan, Wales. He was schooled in Lancashire, attending Rossall School and playing cricket there. In these school matches he batted in the top order, scoring five and 16 against Loretto School on 7 June 1889 while batting at three. He also took a five-wicket haul with his bowling though his bowling style is not recorded, and he did not bowl during his first class career. On 21 June he played against Malvern College and scored 72 and 15 opening the batting, but did not bowl.

=== Gloucestershire ===
Goodwin's first match of the 1896 County Championship – his first class debut – came against Sussex on 25 May 1896. Batting at number six in an innings overshadowed by a score of 243 by WG Grace, Goodwin made 10 before being dismissed by Arthur Collins. Sussex were forced to follow on, and Goodwin dropped to ninth in the batting order and was not required to bat s second time as Gloucestershire chased a small target. On 18 June Goodwin played against Middlesex at Lord's. Again batting at nine, he made 12 and a duck.

Goodwin played only these two games in 1896, but he returned for Gloucestershire for the 1897 County Championship and enjoyed his most prolific season. He played ten games, scoring 239 runs at 21.72 including a high score of 44 not out which came against Sussex on 2 August, overshadowed once more by a Grace century. He also made 36 against Somerset on 19 August, however he was unable to make any lasting impact and played only one match in the 1898 season: scoring five against Sussex on 30 May. He did return more convincingly in 1899, playing five games including his career-high score of 46 made against Somerset on 28 August at Taunton, which was the highest score of the innings, and also a game against a touring Australian side though in this match he only made six. However, a batting average of 12.50 and only 100 runs scored in the season was not enough to secure a regular place in the Gloucestershire line-up. Goodwin managed only nine runs from his three games in 1900, and played only one match in 1901 and then did not appear for Gloucestershire for five years. Meanwhile he joined the staff of Christ's Hospital, an independent school in Horsham, in 1902.

On his return to cricket in 1906, he made two and 13 against Middlesex. He played two more game that season though he could not best that score of 13 and totalled only 26 runs across the year. In 1907, however, he played six matches and reached 117 runs for the season and a best of 34 made against Essex on 5 August. His final first class match came against a South African side that was on an England tour, where he made a pair – two scores of zero. He was dismissed each time by South African Test cricketer Ernie Vogler.

=== Later life ===
Goodwin did not play first-class cricket again. He remained at Christ's Hospital and became President of Horsham Cricket Club. He retired from Christ's Hospital in 1930. He remained there, and died on school premises in 1955, aged 85 years.
