= William Inge (priest, born 1829) =

English cricketer and clergyman

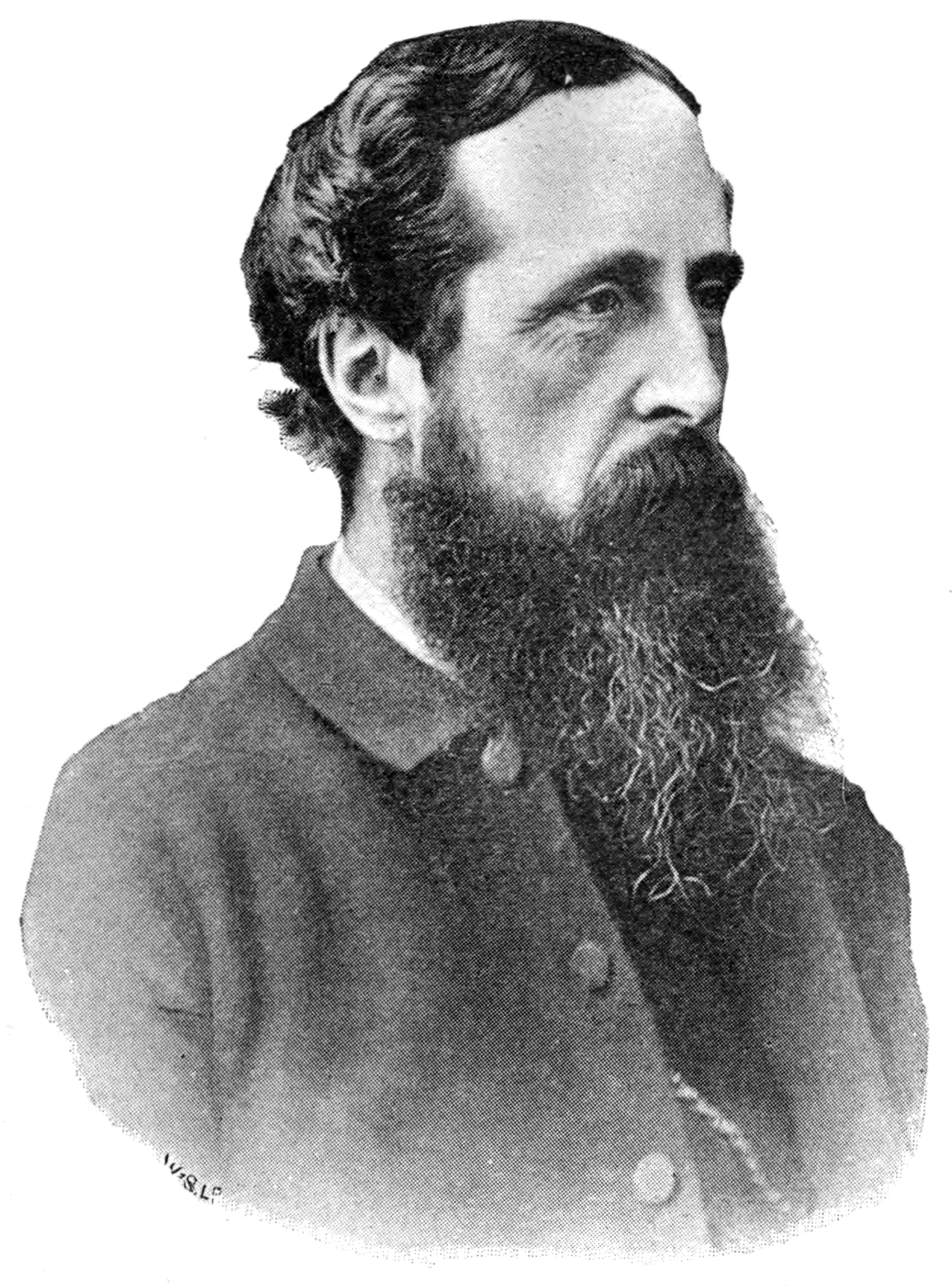

Personal information
- Full name: William Inge
- Born: 4 July 1829; Kegworth, Leicestershire, England
- Died: 23 May 1903 (aged 73); Oxford, Oxfordshire, England
- Relatives: Francis Inge (brother); John Inge (brother); Will Inge (grandson)

Domestic team information
- Years: Team
- 1853: Oxford University

Career statistics
Competition	First-class
Matches	2
Runs scored	20
Batting average	10.00
100s/50s	0/0
Top score	13*
Balls bowled	?
Wickets	7
Bowling average	?
5 wickets in innings	1
10 wickets in match	0
Best bowling	5/?
Catches/stumpings	0/–
- Source: Cricinfo, 9 February 2020

William Inge (4 July 1829 – 23 May 1903) was an English clergyman and academic, who became the Provost of Worcester College, Oxford. He was also a first-class cricketer.

The son of Rev. Charles Inge and his wife Mary Anne Oldershaw, he was born in July 1829 at Kegworth, Leicestershire. He was educated at Shrewsbury School, matriculating at Worcester College, Oxford in 1849, graduating B.A. in 1853. While studying at Oxford, Inge made two appearances in first-class cricket for Oxford University in 1853, appearing against Cambridge University and the Marylebone Cricket Club. In the match against Cambridge, he took a five wicket haul.

Inge was elected a Fellow of Worcester College in 1853, a position he held until his resignation in 1859. He took holy orders in the Church of England in 1857, with his first ecclesiastical posting being at Crayke, North Yorkshire as curate, a post he held until 1875. He took up the post of vicar at Alrewas, Staffordshire in 1875, which he held until 1881. Inge was the provost of Worcester College from 1881 until his death at Oxford in May 1903.

== Family ==
In 1859, Inge married Susanna Mary Churton, daughter of Edward Churton, Archdeacon of Cleveland. They had three sons and three daughters:

- William Ralph Inge (1860–1954), theologian, Dean of St Paul's
- Edward Churton Inge (1864–1865), died in infancy
- Charles Cuthbert Inge (1868–1937), Vicar of St Giles' Church, Oxford
- Agnes Sophia Inge
- Mary Caroline Inge (died 1896), unmarried
- Mary Anne Inge, died in infancy

Inge's brothers, Francis and John, both played first-class cricket, as did his grandson Will Inge.

Academic offices
Preceded by Richard Lynch Cotton	Provost of Worcester College, Oxford; 1881 to 1903	Succeeded by Henry Daniel
