= Rossall hockey =

Variation of hockey and rugby played only at Rossall School in England

Rossall hockey or RossHockey is a unique form of hockey played only at Rossall School, in Fleetwood, on the Fylde coast, Lancashire, England. The game is unique to Rossall School and is played on the beach next to the school during the Lent term only, with the pitch being marked by dragging the hockey sticks in the sand before each match. It is a brutal beach game born of rugby but played with hockey-like sticks by girls as well as boys at the school. It dates back to the 19th century when pitches were too wet for rugby. It is one of the few school coded sports to have remained in use despite the dominance of other national codes in modern sport. The only other examples of school coded sport in the United Kingdom that remain are those of the various Fives codes; of which Rossall has its own, as well as Harrow football, Winchester College football, the Eton wall game and the Eton field game.

== History ==
An old game of RossHockey

Rossall hockey was referenced in the first issue of the Rossallian in 1867, though its exact date of creation is not known. Rossall Hockey started as a derivation of Rossall Football, an adaptation of the Eton field game introduced to the school in 1857 by a school master who had been a student at Eton College.

Initially the rules of RossHockey were slightly different from those of today, with scoring occurring by a system of goals and rougeables. It is also known that there were no restrictions on the number of players in a game and there was no fixed time of play - indeed one game lasted for two days.

The official rules were drawn up in 1873 and two years later the first House RossHockey competition took place. The rules were amended again in 1900 to abolish rougeables. Emphasis has always been placed on the game being one of skill and dribbling - as well as one of brute force.

In 1997 the game was nearly abandoned after over 130 years of history when the supplier of the sticks went bankrupt. A replacement supplier was found in Eccles where they had made lacrosse sticks for many years. The new sticks are slightly less ornate than the traditional ones and also made of hickory rather than ash but the gameplay has not been affected.

== Rules ==
The layout of a RossHockey pitch

Dead ball situations
Name	Description
Free hits	If a free hit is awarded then all players must stand at least five metres from the ball. The ball may be struck with as much vigour as the player chooses. Players may halt the ball in mid air using a hand, however they must not push the ball forward using their hand otherwise a free hit to the other team may be awarded. If the ball is hit out of the side of the pitch a roll-in is given to the opposing team. If the ball is hit off the pitch at the end, outside of the "D" or inside the "D" without stick contact before it crosses the line then a "20-bully" is observed. In free hits, only one defender is allowed to stand in the "D" whilst the rest of the players on the pitch must stand outside.
20-bully	A "20-bully" is like any other bully but occurs on the twenty pace line. A "20-bully" may be awarded if the ball is forced off the pitch at either end.
Line-bully	A "line-bully" is like any other bully but occurs at the top end of the "D". A "line-bully" may be given if a foul is committed by the defending team in their own "D". If three "Line-Bullies" are awarded in a row a penalty stroke will be given to the attacking team.
Penalty stroke	A penalty stroke is like a free hit but always taken from twenty pace line. It gives the attacking team an opportunity to score from outside the "D". Both teams must stand behind the half way line except the taker of the stroke and one of the defending team who may stand behind the goal line to attempt to stop the ball from crossing the line.
Roll-in	A roll-in will be awarded if the ball leaves the side of the pitch. The ball is given to a player on the team who had not hit the ball out. Meanwhile, the rest of the two teams each line up horizontally across the pitch, with the teams two metres apart. The player with the ball then has to roll the ball in. The ball must go at least six paces, as marked by a line on the pitch, but must also touch the ground before the six pace line.

=== Gameplay ===
- The pitch should be drawn up as indicated in the diagram, with the numbers indicating measurements in paces. The pitch should also be 80 paces in length.
- The game begins with a bully at the centre circle. A bully consists of seven players from each team lined up in opposing lines. Three players from each team stand out of the bully as flies. Four sticks from each team must be placed into the centre to trap the ball.
- When the whistle is blown the match begins with each team driving forward in their lines to wrench the ball from the control of the other team.
- When the ball is freed from a bully the teams must each chase after it and force it in across the goal line between the opposing team's posts.
- If a player loses the ball by running ahead of it, another player from their team must take it on. The ball must always be approached from the rear by a player who wishes to take it on - if they fail to do so then they are considered offside.
- Scoring occurs only when the ball is pushed over the line by a player within the "D".

=== Fouls ===
Any of the following are fouls and will result in a free hit except if they are committed in the "D" by the defending team, in which case a line-bully is observed:

Name	Description
Out of control ball	This is considered to be a situation where the ball is pushed more than three metres in front of the person who hit the ball.
Dangerous play	This can consist of any number of offences including the throwing of one's stick at another person, the hacking of the ball with malicious intent or holding one's stick above head-height.
Using the incorrect side of the stick	A stick may not be inverted in order to touch the ball.
Turning with the ball	When a player takes the ball they must not take it with their back against the direction which they are playing. Similarly they may not pirouette whilst dribbling.
Tackling from the wrong side	A player must attempt to tackle the player with the ball by approaching them from the opposite direction to which they are running. Tackling from the side is not permitted.
Offside	In order to take control of the ball a player must have his body behind it. If this is not observed then they are deemed to have taken the ball on from an offside position. If a player loses control of the ball by allowing it to fall behind their stick then they may not touch the ball with the stick until another player on the pitch has done so from an appropriate position.
Passing the ball	The ball must never be passed forward, even as an accident, except in the instance of a free hit.
