= Geoffrey Marsland =

English cricketer and educator

Personal information
- Full name: Geoffrey Peter Marsland
- Born: 17 May 1932; Ashton-under-Lyne, Lancashire, England
- Died: 30 August 2016 (aged 84); Sherborne, Dorset, England
- Batting: Right-handed
- Bowling: Right-arm off break

Domestic team information
- Years: Team
- 1953–1954: Oxford University

Career statistics
Competition	First-class
Matches	17
Runs scored	448
Batting average	16.00
100s/50s	–/3
Top score	74
Balls bowled	234
Wickets	2
Bowling average	69.00
5 wickets in innings	–
10 wickets in match	–
Best bowling	2/68
Catches/stumpings	7/–
- Source: Cricinfo, 10 June 2020

Geoffrey Peter Marsland (17 May 1932 – 30 August 2016) was an English first-class cricketer and educator.

Marsland was born at Ashton-under-Lyne in June 1932. He was educated at Rossall School, before going up to Lincoln College, Oxford. While studying at Oxford, he played first-class cricket for Oxford University, making his debut against Gloucestershire at Oxford in 1953. He played first-class cricket for Oxford until 1954, making seventeen appearances. In his seventeen first-class matches, Marsland scored 448 runs at an average of 16.00 and a high score of 74, one of three half centuries he made.

After graduating from Oxford, he became a schoolmaster who taught at Eton College. Marsland died in August 2016.
