= Lewis Dingle =

English cricketer (born 1988)

Personal information
- Full name: Lewis Allen Dingle
- Born: 16 September 1988 (age 38); Blackpool, Lancashire, England
- Height: 5 ft 0 in (1.52 m)
- Batting: Right-handed
- Bowling: Right-arm medium-fast

Domestic team information
- Years: Team
- 2007–2010: Oxford University

Career statistics
Competition	First-class
Matches	3
Runs scored	7
Batting average	3.50
100s/50s	–/–
Top score	6*
Balls bowled	252
Wickets	1
Bowling average	171.00
5 wickets in innings	–
10 wickets in match	–
Best bowling	1/36
Catches/stumpings	–/–
- Source: Cricinfo, 24 February 2020

Lewis Allen Dingle (born 16 September 1988) is an English former first-class cricketer and physician.

Dingle was born at Blackpool in September 1988. He was educated at Rossall School, before going up to Christ Church, Oxford. While studying at Oxford, he played first-class cricket on three occasions for Oxford University against Cambridge University in The University Matches of 2007, 2008 and 2010. After graduating from Oxford, Dingle trained to become a plastic surgeon.

While at Rossall School he was affectionately known as "Ron" for reasons that are now lost to history.
