= Robert Clayton (cricketer) =

Welsh cricketer

Robert Owen Clayton (1 January 1844 – 26 November 1901) was a Welsh first-class cricketer.

Born Penygroes, Caernarvonshire, Clayton was a right arm fast bowler, he played 70 matches for Yorkshire between 1870 and 1879, and 121 in all, with 33 appearances for the MCC between 1872 and 1881, plus appearances for the North of England (1871-1877), Single (1871), Players of the North (1876-1877), United North of England Eleven (1876) and an England XI (1877).

He was a devastating bowler on his day, taking 254 first-class wickets in all matches at 16.75. His best bowling, 8-66 in a Roses Match, was one of eighteen occasions when he took five wickets in an innings, and he twice took 10 wickets in a match. He had a strike rate of a wicket every 43.12 deliveries. He also scored 1,709 first-class runs, batting right-handed down the order. His only first class fifty was 62 against Middlesex, and he averaged 10.23 over his career.

He was a club professional for Over Darwen, Lancashire in 1867, Hull Town in 1868, Hunslet in 1869 and 1871 and in 1870 with the Sunderland Club in Durham. He was also engaged by Rossall School and Cambridge University. He played for Northumberland in 1870, while engaged at Sunderland and, in 1881, for Lincolnshire. He was a leather dresser by trade, and became a first-class umpire after retiring from the field of play, standing in at least 76 matches between 1876 and 1900.

Clayton died aged 57, in November 1901 in Gainsborough, Lincolnshire.
