= George Malcolm Fox =

British Army officer of the Victorian era

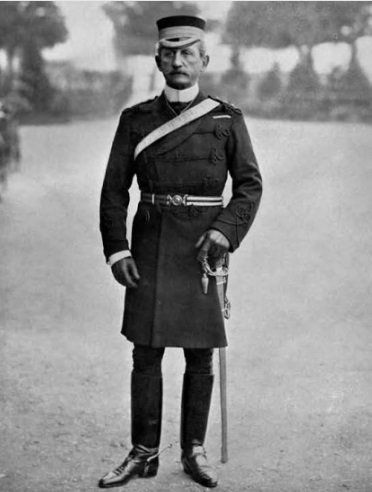
Colonel George Malcolm Fox - The Navy and Army Illustrated (1896)

Colonel Sir George Malcolm Fox (4 March 1843 – 10 March 1918) was Inspector General of Gymnasia at Aldershot, (1890-1897) and Director of Physical Training at the Military School, Aldershot.

== Early life ==
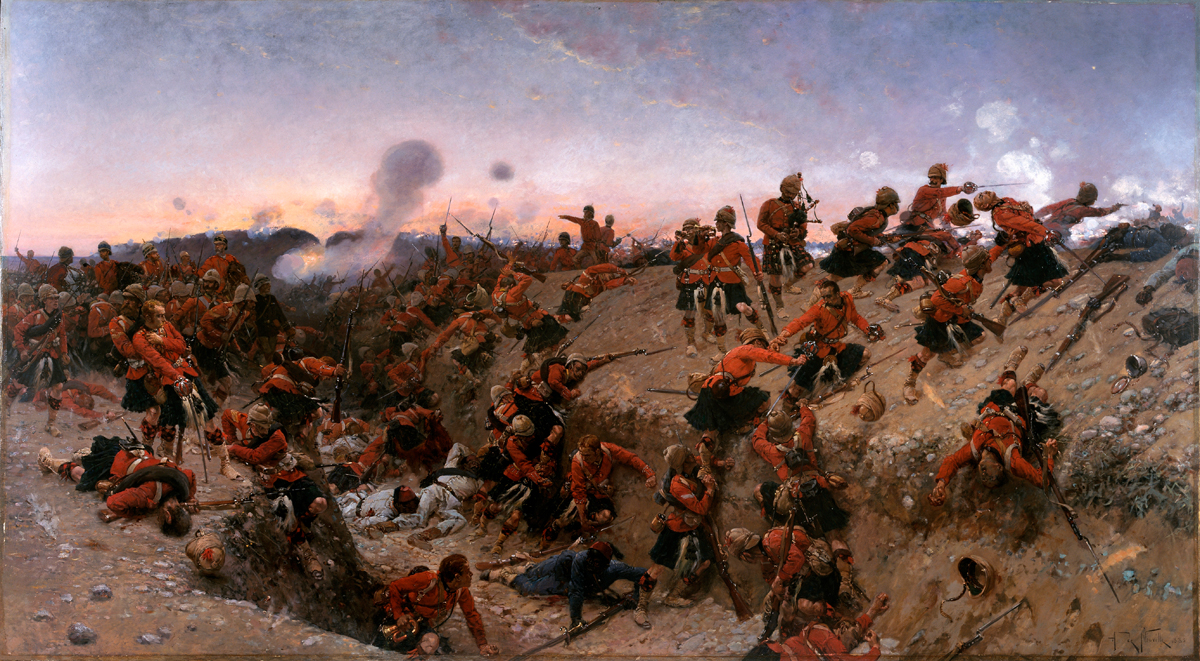
In The Storming of Tel el Kebir by Alphonse de Neuville (1882) Fox (left) is depicted wounded in the shoulder. In reality he was shot in the thigh

Fox was born in Derby in Derbyshire in 1843, one of six children born to Marianne née Strutt (1814–1898) and Douglas Fox (1798–1885), a magistrate and surgeon. He was educated at Rossall School and Brighton College before joining the army. Fox began his military career serving with the 100th (Prince of Wales's Royal Canadian) Regiment of Foot from 1863-1875, being promoted to Lieutenant in 1865 and Captain in 1871. With his regiment he saw service in Malta. After transferring to the 42nd (Royal Highland) Regiment of Foot (the 'Black Watch') he was with his regiment in Aldershot in 1881 before seeing service in the Egypt Campaign where he was wounded during the Battle of Tell El Kebir in 1882. In Alphonse-Marie-Adolphe de Neuville's painting The Storming of Tel el Kebir (1882) Fox is depicted to the left wounded in the shoulder and being held by another soldier, whereas in reality he was shot in the thigh.

== At Aldershot ==
Fox had an interest in physical training, in particular in fencing and boxing, and he organised various sporting competitions in the Army which lead to his appointment at Aldershot in April 1883 as Assistant Inspector of Gymnasia under Colonel G. M. Onslow. In July 1883 he was promoted Major. Fox was promoted to Lieutenant-Colonel in 1888 and was a Colonel by 1900. Fox married firstly Mary Rose "Minnie" Newall in 1881 who died in childbirth in 1882 giving birth to her daughter Mary Agnes Dorothy Fox (1882–1968); and secondly, Marion Jane Mills (1863–1957) in 1884, with whom he had a daughter: Marion Inez Douglas Fox (1885–1973).

== Inspector of Gymnasia ==
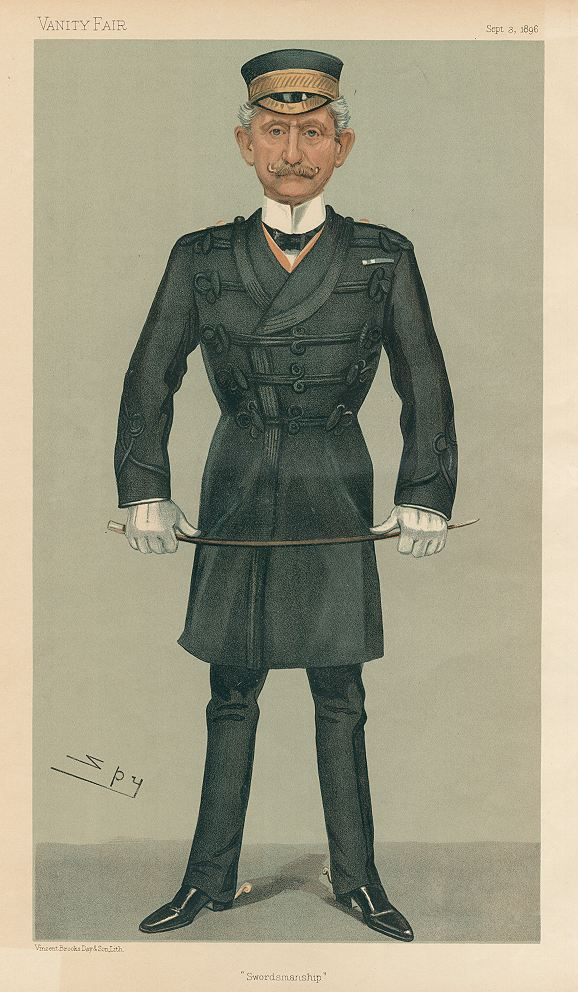
Colonel George Malcolm Fox in Vanity Fair - Spy (1896)

From 1890 to 1897 Fox was Inspector of Gymnasia at Aldershot, having succeeded Colonel G. M. Onslow, and financed the expansion of the army athletic grounds and gymnasia at Aldershot using his second wife's money including in 1894 building the gymnasium that was later to bear his name. An expert swordsman, he designed swords for the British Army including the 1895 Infantry Sword Exercise and the Pattern 1897 infantry officer's sword, leading to his 'Swordsmanship' caricature appearing in Vanity Fair in 1896, drawn by Spy. He was also influential in the design of the pattern 1908 cavalry sword. As Inspector of Gymnasia Fox had the responsibility for deciding which skills needed to be incorporated to form the set routines for gymnastics competitions in Scotland. The original gymnasium of 1861 was replaced with the much larger Headquarters Gymnasium in 1894 at the instigation of Fox.

== Later life ==
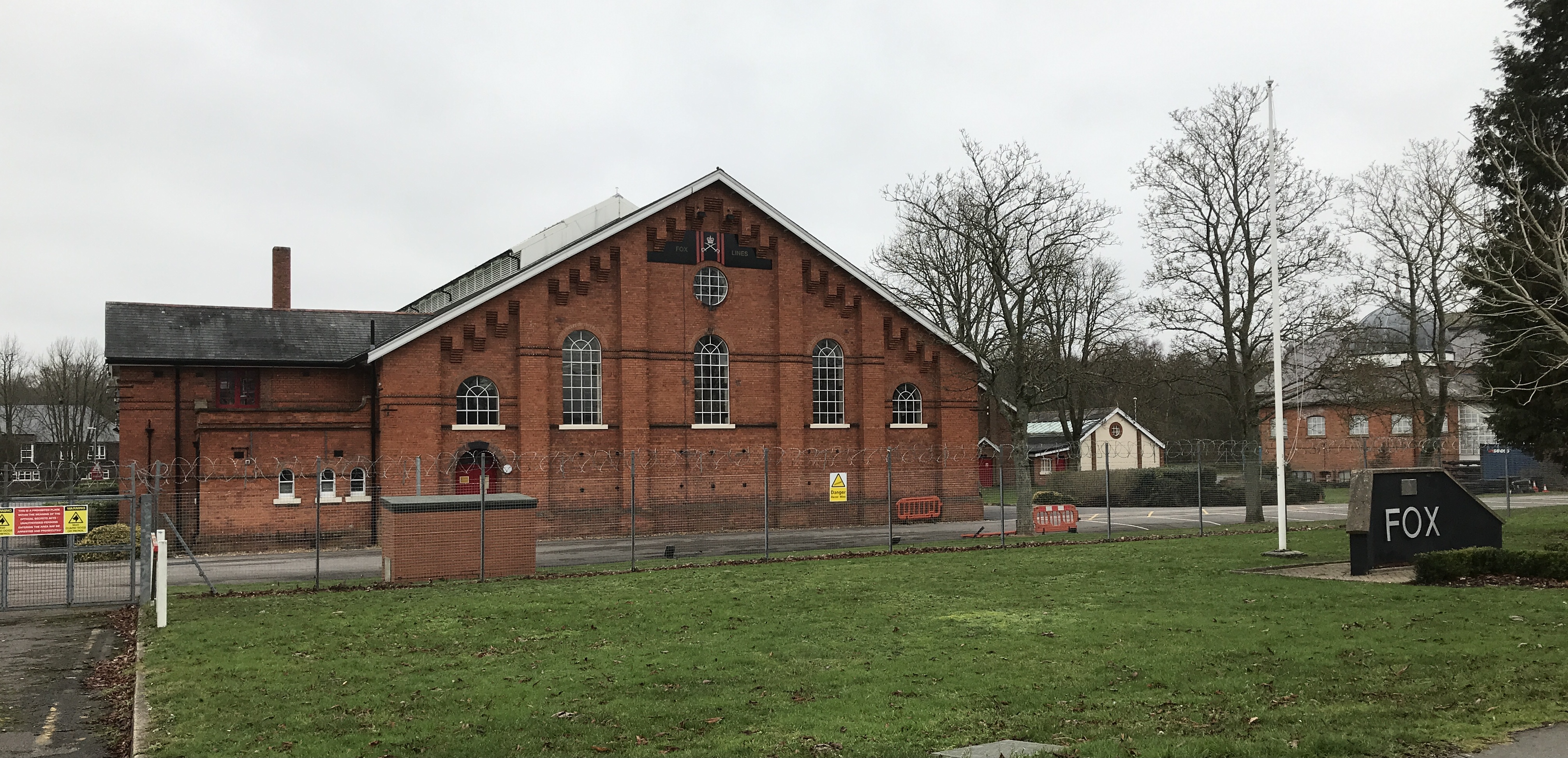
Fox Gymnasium from Queen’s Avenue (2021)

In 1900 he retired with the rank of Colonel. He was temporarily Inspector of Gymnasia from 1900 to 1902 during his retirement while Lieutenant-Colonel J. Scott Napier, the then holder of the post was employed in South Africa during the Boer War. In 1903 he was seconded to the Board Of Education as the Chief Inspector of Physical Training. He was a member of the Bartitsu Club.

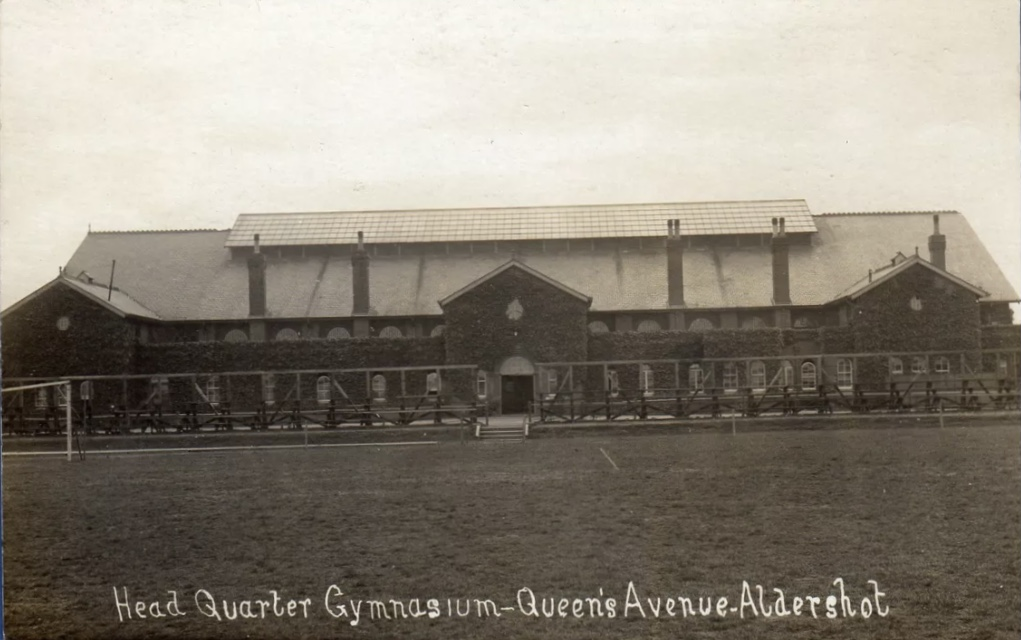
The Headquarters Gymnasium (1894) renamed Fox Gymnasium in the 1940s

Colonel George Malcolm Fox was knighted in 1910. After a series of strokes Fox died at his home, Rustington House near Littlehampton in March 1918. In his will he left an estate valued at £31,244 12s 5d. The Headquarters Gymnasium in Aldershot built by him in 1894 was renamed the Fox Gymnasium in his honour in the 1940s and remains the main training gymnasium of the Royal Army Physical Training Corps (RAPT). Fox Lines, where today the RAPT complex is located, was also named in his memory in 1994.

== Medal entitlement ==
George Malcolm Fox was entitled to the following medals:

Ribbon	Description	Notes
	Knight Bachelor	1910
	Egypt Medal	1882
	Khedive's Star	1882
	Swedish Order of the Sword	
