= Edward Fitzherbert (British Army officer) =

English cricketer and British Army general (1885–1979)

Major-General Edward Fitzherbert CBE DSO MC
- Born: 3 December 1885; Poona, Bombay Presidency, British India
- Died: 1 August 1979 (aged 93); Wandsworth, London, England
- Military career
- Allegiance: United Kingdom
- Branch: British Army
- Service years: 1905–1943
- Rank: Major-General
- Conflicts: First World War; Second World War
- Awards: Commander of the Order of the British Empire; Distinguished Service Order; Military Cross; Mentioned in Despatches
- Cricket career

Cricket information

Career statistics
Competition	First-class
Matches	1
Runs scored	3
Batting average	1.50
100s/50s	0/0
Top score	3
Catches/stumpings	0/–
- Source: Cricinfo, 26 May 2019

Major-General Edward Herbert Fitzherbert, CBE, DSO, MC (3 December 1885 – 1 August 1979) was a British Army officer and an English first-class cricketer. In a military career which spanned from 1905 to 1943, Fitzherbert served with the Royal Army Service Corps during both the First World War and the Second World War. He was highly decorated, being awarded both the Military Cross and the Distinguished Service Order during the First World War. He also played first-class cricket for the British Army cricket team.

== Early life and First World War ==
Fitzherbert was born at Poona in British India, the son of Colonel Edward Herbert Fitzherbert. Moving to England, he was educated at Rossall School, before attending the Royal Military College, Sandhurst. He graduated from Sandhurst in August 1905 and entered into the Army Service Corps as a second lieutenant. He was promoted to the rank of lieutenant in August 1907, with promotion to the rank of captain coming one week into the First World War in August 1914. He was made a temporary major in November 1914. He was awarded the Military Cross in June 1915, and was awarded the Distinguished Service Order in the 1918 New Year Honours. In January 1918, he was made a temporary lieutenant colonel.

== Later military career and life ==
After the war, Fitzherbert relinquished both the temporary ranks of lieutenant colonel and major in July 1920 and October 1920 respectively. In November 1920, he was again made a temporary major. He made a single appearance in first-class cricket for the British Army cricket team against Cambridge University at Fenner's in 1923. Batting twice in the match, he scored 3 runs in the Army's first-innings, before being dismissed by Claude Ashton, while in their second-innings he was dismissed without scoring by Cecil Booth. In October 1924, he gained the full rank of major. He was appointed at the Deputy Assistant Director of Supplies and Transportation for the Rhine Army in April 1929, a position he relinquished upon the dissolution of the Rhine Army later that year. He was shortly thereafter appointed to as Chief Inspector of Subdivision Transportation in January 1930, a post he held until July 1931. In October 1931, he was promoted to the rank of lieutenant colonel, with promotion to the rank of colonel coming in October 1935. He was appointed as the assistant director of Supplies and Transportation at the War Office in May 1937.

Serving during the Second World War, Fitzherbert was promoted to the rank of major-general in January 1941, with his retirement from active service coming in June 1943. He was appointed a Commander of the Order of the British Empire in the 1943 New Year Honours. He exceeded the age for recall in December 1945 and was removed from the Reserve of Officers list. He was appointed to the ceremonial position of colonel commandant of the Royal Army Service Corps in March 1947, a position he held until December 1950. He died at Wandsworth in August 1979.

== Bibliography ==
- Smart, Nick (2005). Biographical Dictionary of British Generals of the Second World War. Barnesley: Pen & Sword. ISBN 1844150496.
