= Clive Phillipps-Wolley =

British writer

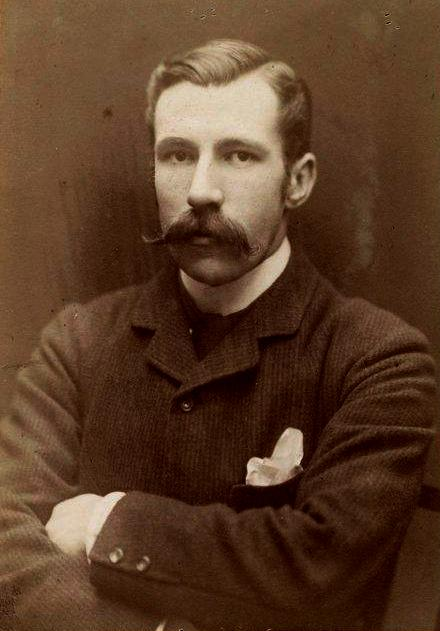
- Born: Edward Clive Oldnall Long Phillipps; 3 April 1853 Wimborne. East Dorset, UK
- Died: 8 July 1918 (aged 65) Duncan, British Columbia
- Education: Rossall School
- Spouse: Jane Fenwick m. 1878; d. 1921
- Children: 4

Sir Clive Phillipps-Wolley (born Edward Clive Oldnall Long Phillipps, 3 April 1853 – 8 July 1918) was a British-Canadian official, author and big game hunter. His two most famous poems are perhaps The Sea Queen Wakes (1896) and Coronation Hymn composed in honour of the coronation of George V.

== Early life ==
Edward Clive Oldnall Long Phillipps was born in 1853 as the eldest son of a public schoolmaster Richard Augustus Long Phillipps, who was distantly related to Lord Robert Clive. He was educated at Rossall School.

In 1877, as a legally entitled but distantly related male inheritor, he successfully petitioned to inherit his great-grandfather's Wolley estate with land covering about two hundred acres. He added the Wolley family name to his own and dropped "Edward" from his legal name.

== Career ==
At age 20, Phillipps was appointed, to the vice-consulship of the British Legation in Kerch, Crimea. He explored and hunted big game in the Caucasus. He studied law, was called to the bar at Middle Temple but practised law for less than a year. After inheriting the Wolley estate, Phillips-Wolley resigned from the British consular service and joined the fourth battalion of the South Wales Borderers, taught marksmanship, and attained the rank of captain.

He was an active cricketer, playing during 1885-86 at county level for Shropshire while at club level for Shrewsbury, scoring in 6 matches 14 runs while taking 22 wickets.

In 1882, he went on a two-month hunting trip in British Columbia and in the autumn of 1887 he went, accompanied by his wife, on another visit to Canada and they stayed for a considerable time in Victoria, British Columbia.

In the early 1890s, Clive and Jane Phillipps-Wolley, with their three daughters and son, settled in Oak Bay, British Columbia. He edited for Longman, Green & Company's Badminton Library the 2-volume collection Big Game Shooting (1894) and contributed 2 essays to the first volume and 4 essays to the second volume; a second edition of the 2 volumes was published in 1895.

In 1896, Phillipps-Wolley was appointed to enforce the Health Act in the mining districts of British Columbia. In the early 1900s, the family moved into an estate occupying all of Piers Island, sold in 1909. In 1912, the family moved to "The Grange", a mansion located near Duncan, British Columbia and designed according to their requirements by the architect Samuel Maclure.

In 1908, Phillipps-Wolley began to warn of the dangers posed by an expanding German navy and in 1910 joined the Navy League of Canada. For his patriotic verse in support of the British empire and his work for the Navy League, he was knighted in 1914, the only British Columbian writer to be knighted.

== Personal life ==
In 1879, married Jane Fenwick, the second daughter of Rear-Admiral William Henry Fenwick (1827–1906). When in Oak Bay, British Columbia, he commissioned architect William Ridgway Wilson (1863–1957) to design and build a mansion for them (The Oak Bay street where they lived was later renamed Clive Drive). They were the parents of three daughters and one son.

His only son, Lieutenant-Commander Clive Phillipps-Wolley, died, along with 47 other crew members, on 22 September 1914 in the sinking of HMS Hogue by the German U-boat U-9.

Phillipps-Wolley died in Duncan on 8 July 1918.

== Selected publications ==
- My Soldier Keeper. New York: Thomas Y. Crowell & Co. 1880.
- Sport in the Crimea and Caucasus. CIHM/ICMH Microfiche series;no. 15889. London: Richard Bentley & Son. 1881. ISBN 978-0-665-15889-6.
- Savage Svânetia. CIHM/ICMH Microfiche series;no. 15885. London: Richard Bentley & Son. 1883. ISBN 978-0-665-15885-8; 2 vols.
- The Trottings of a Tenderfoot: A Visit to the Columbian Fiords and Spitzbergen. CIHM/ICMH Microfiche series;no. 15892. London: Richard Bentley & Son. 1884. ISBN 978-0-665-15892-6.
- A Sportsman's Eden. CIHM/ICMH Microfiche series;no. 15890. London: Richard Bentley & Son. 1888. ISBN 978-0-665-15890-2.
- Snap: A Legend of Lone Mountain. CIHM/ICMH Microfiche series;no. 15888. New York: Longmans, Green & Co. 1890. ISBN 978-0-665-15888-9.
- Gold, Gold in Cariboo! A Story of Adventure in British Columbia. CIHM/ICMH Microfiche series;no. 15879. London: Blackie. 1894. ISBN 978-0-665-15879-7.
- The Queensberry Cup. CIHM/ICMH Microfiche series;no. 15883. London: Methuen. 1895. ISBN 978-0-665-15883-4.
- One of the Broken Brigade. CIHM/ICMH Microfiche series;no. 15882. London: George Bell. 1897. ISBN 978-0-665-15882-7.
- The Stikine River: The Route to Klondyke. CIHM/ICMH Microfiche series;no. 15891. 1897. ISBN 978-0-665-15891-9.
- The Chicamon Stone. CIHM/ICMH Microfiche series;no. 15878. London: Smith, Elder & Co. 1900. ISBN 978-0-665-15878-0.
- The Canadian Naval Question: Addresses Delivered by Clive Phillipps-Wolley. CIHM/ICMH Microfiche series;no. 75758. Toronto: W. Briggs. 1910. ISBN 978-0-665-75758-7.
