= Hugh Trevor Lambrick =

British archaeologist, historian and administrator

Hugh Trevor Lambrick CIE (20 April 1904–31 August 1982) was a British archaeologist, historian and administrator.

During his distinguished career as a member of the Indian Civil Service he also became known for his archaeological work at Mohenjo-daro and Harappa.

== Early life ==
He was born in 1904 at Shardlow, Derbyshire, England, the son of the Revd. Charles Menzies Lambrick (1862–1947) and Jessie Mabel née Trevor (1875–1946), who was born in India. His brother was George Lambrick (1901–1946) and his sister Hope Lambrick (1911–1983). He was educated at The Dene preparatory school in Caterham in Surrey (1912–17) and after at the Rossall School in Fleetwood in Lancashire (1917–23). He won an open scholarship to Oriel College, Oxford (1923–6) where he was awarded a first-class honours degree in modern history.

== Career ==
In October 1927 Lambrick joined the Indian Civil Service (ICS) after passing the open competitive civil service examination; he chose to serve in Sindh where members of his mother's family had served before him. From 1927 to 1947 he served in Sindh province (present day Pakistan) as Commissioner where he did most of his archaeological work, including at Mohenjo-daro and Harappa. Lambrick became fluent in the Sindhi language and also became familiar with the Balochi language, developing an appreciation for Balochi poetry and music. Such was his interest in the geography, anthropology and archaeology of the Sindh province that he became Secretary of the Sindh Historical Society. During the 1940s he was involved in suppressing the Indian independence movement which in 1943 lead to the hanging of Pir of Pagaro VI, the spiritual leader of the Hurs. In 1944 Lambrick was appointed a Companion of the Order of the Indian Empire (CIE) and retired from the Indian Civil Service in 1946.

In 1947 he became a historian and a Fellow of Oriel College, Oxford where he served until 1971. In October 1948 he married Gabrielle Margaret Jennings (1913–1968), a principal civil servant in the Overseas Finance Section in the Treasury and the younger daughter of Herbert Henry Jennings, a hospital administrator and amateur art connoisseur and collector. The couple had two sons: Charles Trevor Lambrick (born 1949), a solicitor; and George Hugh Lambrick (born 1952), an archaeologist. At Oriel Lambrick was appointed Lecturer in Modern History and Treasurer in 1951 but relinquished the latter role in 1955 when he was appointed Spalding senior research fellow in Indian history at the college. In 1971 Lambrick retired from his post at Oriel and became an emeritus fellow. He was awarded a DLitt by the University of Oxford and became a Fellow of the Society of Antiquaries. In 1978 he was awarded the Richard Burton memorial medal by the Royal Asiatic Society.

Hugh Trevor Labrick died at the John Radcliffe Hospital in Oxford in August 1982.

== Bibliography ==
His collected papers are held at the British Library. Lambrick published seven books between 1952 and 1976 including a novel The Terrorist (1972), biographies of Sir Charles James Napier (1952) and John Jacob of Jacobabad (1960; revised edition, 1975) and two volumes in the History of Sind series: Sind: A General Introduction (1964) and Sind Before the Muslim Conquest (1973). He wrote numerous articles for historical and archaeological journals. His last publication was a chapter on 'The Hill Country of Sind and its People' in Sind Through The Centuries (ed. Hamida Khuro, 1982).
