= Rossall School =

Private school in Rossall near Fleetwood, Lancashire, England

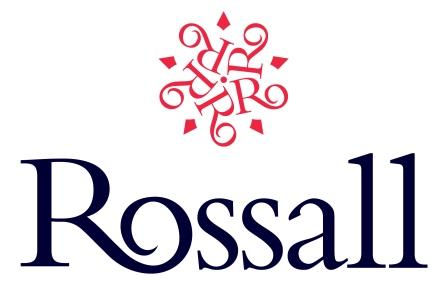

- Rossall as seen from the playing fields

Location
- Rossall, Fleetwood, Lancashire, FY7 8JW; England; 53.8957°N 3.0424°W

Information
- Type: Private day and boarding Public school
- Motto: Mens Agitat Molem 'Mind Over Matter'
- Religious affiliation: Church of England
- Established: 1844; 182 years ago
- Founder: The Rev. Canon St Vincent Beechey
- President: Edward Stanley, 19th Earl of Derby
- Chairman of Governors: Keith Budge
- Headmaster: Andrew McBride
- Staff: 300
- Gender: Coeducational
- Age: 0 to 18
- Enrolment: 920
- Houses: 9
- Colours: Red, grey and navy blue
- Former pupils: Old Rossallians
- Website: www.rossall.org.uk

Rossall School is a public school (English fee-charging boarding and day school), for 0–18 year olds, that is situated on a 161-acre (0.65 km^{2}) estate, next to Rossall Beach, between Cleveleys and Fleetwood, Lancashire, England.

It was founded in 1844, by the Anglican clergyman St. Vincent Beechey, as a sister school to Marlborough College, to educate the sons of clergymen. By the end of the Victorian era, it was considered to be one of the top 30 public schools in the UK.

It was the first school in the UK to have a Combined Cadet Force and one of the first to introduce the International Baccalaureate. It is a member of the Headmasters' and Headmistresses' Conference and was granted a royal charter in 1890. It now has about 900 pupils.

== History ==
=== Foundation ===
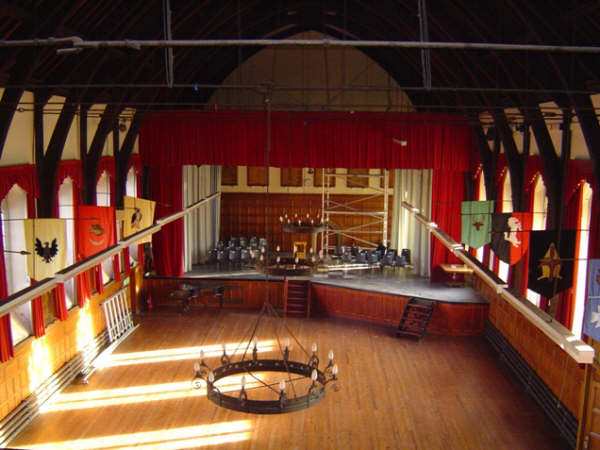
The interior of Big School as viewed from the balcony

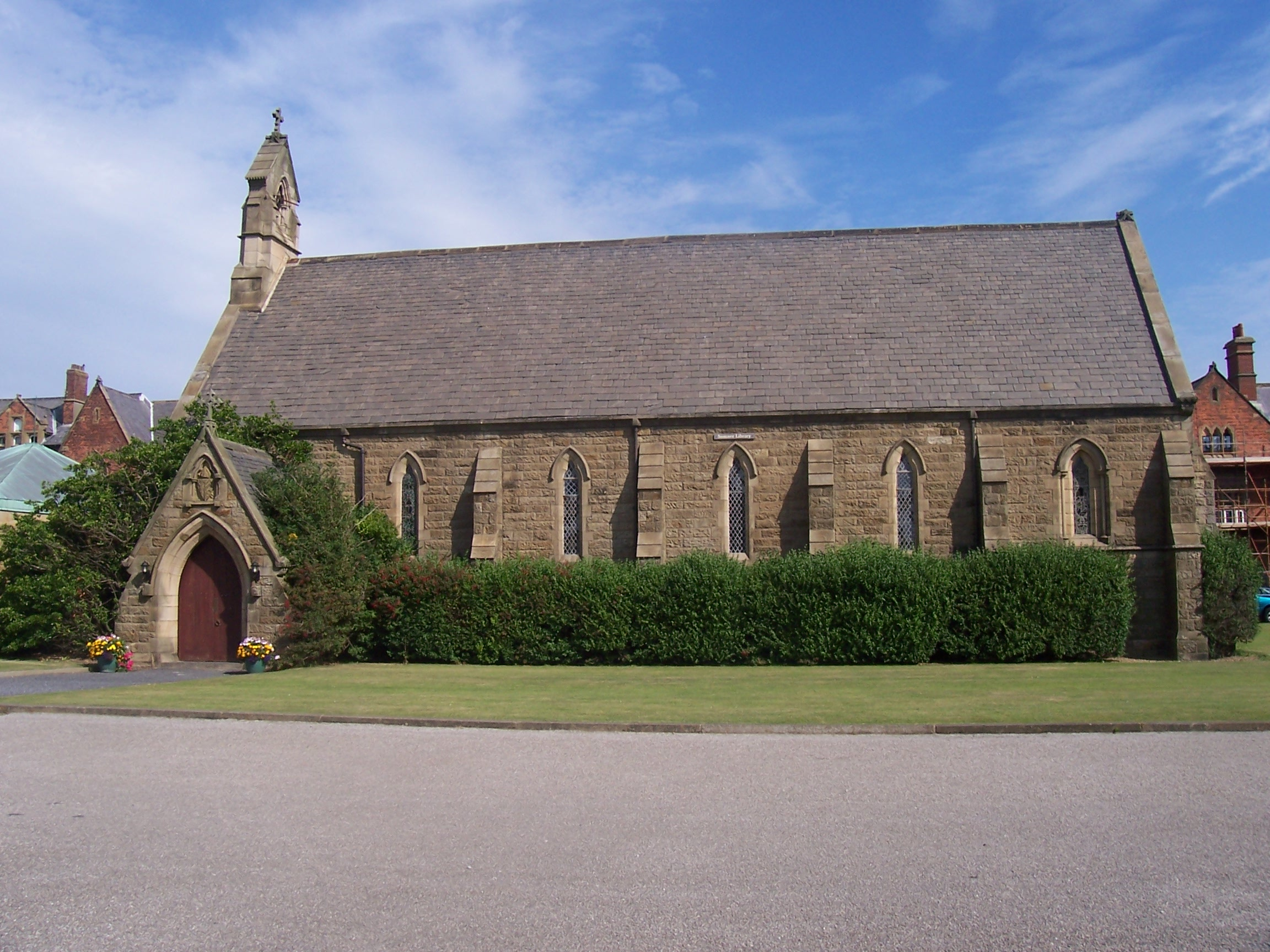
Rossall Sumner Library (Formerly the school chapel)

An aerial view of the Rossall estate pre 2008

Another aerial view of Rossall

The idea of founding a boarding school on the Fylde coast originates with a Corsican man named Zenon Vantini. As the owner of the North Euston Hotel in Fleetwood, Vantini opened his hotel expecting many visitors but few people arrived. To boost the number of visitors to Fleetwood and help his hotel and the local economy, Vantini opened two schools in the vicinity of Fleetwood, one for boys and another for girls, totalling 1,000 pupils. The early Victorian period was marked by high child mortality rates, and Vantini expected that in the long term, the schools could be funded by a form of tontine insurance scheme, whereby the cost to educate children who reached their teenage years was offset by those who had died in infancy.

Vantini called a meeting at the North Euston Hotel to discuss the foundation of the schools with local businessmen and clergy. It was decided that any school that was to be founded would be directly affiliated to the Church of England. This was to be the first major Church of England school in the north of England and a sister school to Marlborough College which had opened the previous year. It was soon established that there was little hope of founding the girls' school and this idea was abandoned, with the boys' school pupil numbers reduced to 200. Consequently, Vantini's involvement with the scheme steadily dissipated, St. Vincent Beechey, the parish priest of Fleetwood, took over.

Beechey set about finding the funds required to set up such a school. Beechey received the financial patronage of Peter Hesketh-Fleetwood and The Earl of Derby, and the service of Duke of Devonshire as vice-president and John Bird Sumner, then Bishop of Chester and later Archbishop of Canterbury, as visitor.

As a result of his insufficient funds, after he had over-invested in the development of Fleetwood, Hesketh-Fleetwood leased his ancestral home of Rossall Hall to the school for 21 years, and gave them the opportunity to buy it for £7,000 after ten years.

The Northern Church of England Boarding School, which was renamed Rossall College under the governance of William Osborne, opened on 22 August 1844, but nearly shut down in its infancy because of huge outbreaks of scarlet fever.

=== 1844 to 1914 ===
The foundation stone to the school chapel, now the Sumner Library, was laid in 1848 by the first Bishop of Manchester, James Prince Lee. Rossall's swift and successful development can be seen by its inclusion in the book The Great Schools of England (1865).

The current chapel was constructed in the 1860s and the school underwent further development from the 1880s to 1900 to accommodate more pupils and to create further facilities such as the gym which still stands. In 1874 Rossall became the first Church of England school to play a Catholic school in an inter-school sports fixture, at cricket, leading Protestant newspapers to warn against such activities and advise Rossall parents to be wary of encroaching papism (the school in question was Stonyhurst College).

Two decades later, roughly one hundred O.R.s served in the Boer War, nearly half of them winning distinctions or mentions in despatches. Seventeen old boys died in active service, all of whom are now commemorated in the stalls of the school chapel.

Rossall was widely considered to be one of the top 30 public schools in the UK by the end of Queen Victoria's reign and earned itself a place in the Public Schools Yearbook and the Public School News section of the Cambridge Review. Despite some financial difficulties as a result of fund embezzling by a bursar, by the end of the 1920s Rossall's academic results were amongst the best in the country with record numbers achieving scholarships to Oxbridge and attaining distinctions in the Higher Certificate examinations.

=== 1914 to 1945 ===
During the world wars large numbers of Old Rossallians lost their lives in combat, 297 in World War I alone – the majority of whom are now commemorated in the extension memorial chapel. Rossall has a memorial plaque at St Georges Chapel by the Menin Gate in honour of its fallen, alongside schools such as Rugby, Eton and Harrow. 1,617 ORs fought in World War I, 300 of whom received war honours.

Rossall's World War I war honours (with bar)
V.C.	G.C.M.G.	C.B.	C.I.E.	C.M.G.	D.S.O.	C.B.E.	O.B.E.	M.B.E.	D.S.C.	M.C.	D.F.C.	A.F.C.	D.C.M.	M.M.
2	1	4	2	16	54 (9)	9	37	9	2	154 (13)	4	3	2	2

Before the outbreak of the Second World War Rossall had made plans to accommodate Westminster School however these plans were scrapped when the government requisitioned the campus for several departments of the Office of Works, the Board of Education and the Ministry of Pensions. As a result, the school moved to Naworth Castle. The government departments put up prefabricated buildings and found other premises close by as soon as possible, and left in 1940. The school returned and took in a school from the south-east, as the Westminster School had found an alternative solution. The eventual choice was that of Alleyn's who had to be evacuated from London as a result of the risk of bombing. Another side effect of the war was that there was only one centenary dinner celebrating the 100th year of Rossall. It was conducted by Old Rossallians imprisoned in Changi Prison, a notorious POW camp in Singapore during the Japanese occupation.

=== 1945 to present ===
Benjamin Britten gave a concert in Big School in 1954. In the 1970s, in a bid to ensure the highest standards during a period of declining boarding, girls were allowed to enrol. Throughout the 1980s and 1990s the school pushed on with a development programme and had royal visits including from the Queen in 1994 to celebrate the 150th anniversary of its foundation. The school went through great financial difficulty at the turn of the millennium.

Rossall promotes affordable private education: 80% of those who attend the school are the first in their family to attend a private school and a large number of scholarships and bursaries are available. 2007 saw the return of the Rossall Summer School – developed to give children from outside the UK the opportunity to develop their English speaking skills as well as being a chance for those thinking of going to a boarding school to consider whether they are suited to the lifestyle.

On 23 March 2022, a plane was forced to make an emergency landing on the school's field as a shortage of fuel meant the pilot was unable to complete the flight. Nobody was injured, and no pupils were at the school at the time.

== Campus ==
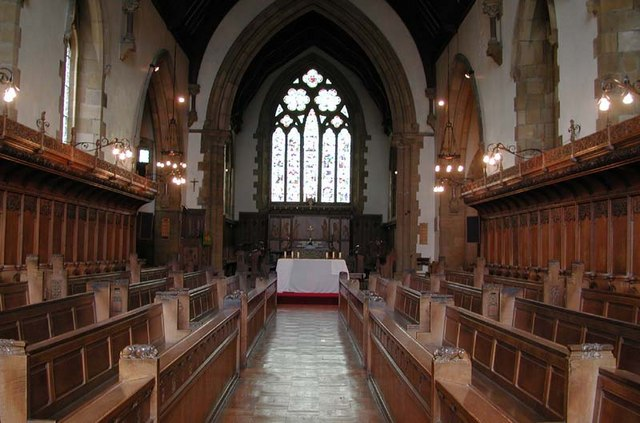
The Interior of the School Chapel

=== Architecture ===
==== The Archway ====
The archway was erected in 1867, under the reign of William Osborne, with the foundation stone being laid by William Cavendish, 7th Duke of Devonshire. It is believed to have been designed by Edward Graham Paley. It is clearly modelled on the entrance gates of the Oxbridge colleges and originally had large wooden doors which were locked at night; these have since been removed for improvements in access.

==== The Chapel ====
In the 1860s a new school chapel was built to cope with the increasing number of pupils, the old chapel serving, as it does today, as the school library. The new chapel was designed by Edward Graham Paley, extended by Robert Lorimer and includes carvings by Eric Gill. The chapel organ was designed by Harrison & Harrison. Rossall celebrated the chapel's 150th Anniversary on 1 April 2012.

==== The Dining Hall ====
The original school dining hall burnt down in the 1920s. The replacement, the current dining hall, was designed by Sir Hubert Worthington. The design was not without fault however – it was constructed from bricks encased in a weatherable coating that would dissolve away to leave it looking in the same condition as the rest of the square. The largest section of wood panelling behind the headmaster's table in the dining hall is made from an oak tree that grew in the back garden of George Mallory. It was claimed in 1944 that it was the largest school dining hall in the country, and was described by F. A. M. Webster in his book Our Great Public Schools as, "one of the most splendid in the country."

There are four coats of arms attached to the exterior of the dining hall to commemorate the various families associated with Rossall over the years: the Allen Family for the medieval and Renaissance owners of the site; the Hesketh Family for the Anglican family who acquired the sequestered property of the Roman Catholic Allens during the English Reformation; the Fleetwood family who intermarried with the Heskeths and became the owners of the site prior to the loan of Rossall Hall for the opening of the school by their last representative, Sir Peter Hesketh-Fleetwood; and the Beechey Family for the founder of the school St. Vincent Beechey.

During the summer of 2020 the Dining Hall was undergoing major renovations that were funded through the Rossall School Foundation. Renovations included a new colour scheme, which is now light blue and white.

==== Canberra Grammar School ====
Stone from Rossall can be found in the cloisters of Canberra Grammar School along with stones from Eton, Westminster, St Paul's, Charterhouse, Uppingham, Clifton, Tonbridge, Shrewsbury, Sherborne, Wellington, Cheltenham, Repton and Radley Schools.

== Rossall today ==
The school offers both A-levels and the International Baccalaureate IB Diploma Programme for Sixth form pupils. Senior School pupils follow the British curriculum, whilst the Junior School has its own curriculum.

=== Extra-curricular activities ===
==== Sports ====
Ross hockey

The Museum Theatre

There are 64 clubs and societies in operation at Rossall including the traditional rugby union, football, fives and hockey. There is a Croquet Club. As well as competing in sporting competitions around the country, Rossall plays host to inter-school tournaments. These have included hockey, preparatory school rugby union and basketball. The fives competition in 2005 included Lancing College, Malvern College, Uppingham School and Shrewsbury School.

Since 2016, Rossall School offers the "Elite Football Programme", a co-corricular program for boys and girls. The program was run in partnership with Fleetwood Town F.C. Following the end of the relationship of the schools partnership with Fleetwood Town in 2024 the School and the new partnership Club, Manchester City F.C., announced their collaboration going forward in running the "Elite Football Programme".

==== Combined Cadet Force ====
Rossall was the first school in the United Kingdom to form a Cadet Corps. It was founded in February 1860 when the threat of a French/Irish Catholic invasion was at its height. Although Rugby School claims to have raised a company of Volunteer Riflemen in 1804 Rossall's is the oldest contingent continuously in existence and the one from which many other schools drew the inspiration of founding theirs. Other schools such as Eton College formed their corps a few months after Rossall. From 1890 to 1908 the corps was affiliated to the 1st Lancashire Engineer Volunteers. The institution is still present in the school today with around 100 cadets currently enlisted. In recent years the shooting team has excelled with notable victories in the Home Guard Cup and Loyal's Regimental Cup. The CCF at Rossall received the Queens colours on Tuesday 29 June 2010, to celebrate its 150th anniversary and to acknowledge its status as the oldest cadet corps in the UK.

Through the Cadet Vocational Qualifications Organisation (CVQO) the School CCF offers cadets (aged 16–19) and above the opportunity to gain internationally recognised BTEC First Diploma qualifications in Public Services and Music. Each BTEC First Diploma is the equivalent of 4 GCSEs, grade C – A*.

== School terms ==
The Gazebo

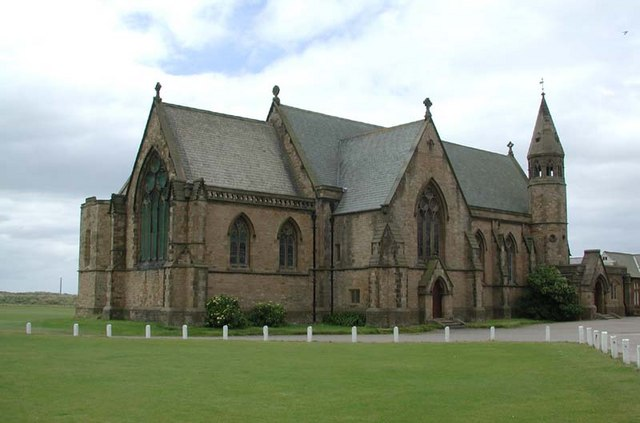
The Chapel of St. John the Baptist, Rossall School

The "Dick Pavilion"

- Rossall fives – Rossall's unique version of fives – an amalgamation of Rugby, Winchester and Eton fives – though it resembles Rugby fives more than the other two.
- Rossall hockey – A relatively famous game unique to Rossall – a cross between rugby and hockey, originally derived from the Eton field game, played on the beach in the harshest winter months.

== Old Rossallians ==
Rossall Prep School

The Old Rossallian Tie

- J. R. Ackerley – openly gay author, diarist and memoirist
- Bill Ashton – founder of the National Youth Jazz Orchestra
- Michael Barratt – BBC television presenter
- Sir Thomas Beecham – conductor and founder of numerous orchestras including the London Philharmonic and Royal Philharmonic
- Arthur Bigge, 1st Baron Stamfordham – Private Secretary to Queen Victoria and King George V. Responsible for the change in the name of the royal household from Saxe-Coburg-Gotha to Windsor in 1917
- Little Boots – singer/songwriter, winner of the BBC's Sound of 2009
- David Brown – owner of both Aston Martin and Lagonda car companies from 1947 to 1972. Aston Martin models designated "DB" are named after him.
- Father Thomas R. D. Byles – Catholic priest who refused to leave the Titanic in order to help fellow passengers evacuate. He perished as it sank.
- Patrick Campbell – Irish journalist, humorist and television personality
- Leslie Charteris – author and creator of The Saint books; a character later portrayed on television by Roger Moore in the 1960s and Ian Ogilvy in Return of the Saint in the 1970s
- Michael Dickinson – world record holding National Hunt trainer
- James Donald – Scottish character actor (The Bridge on the River Kwai, The Great Escape)
- J. G. Farrell – Booker Prize-winning novelist
- Lewin Fitzhamon – filmmaker
- George Malcolm Fox – inspector of Gymnasia and sword designer
- F. W. Harvey – First World War poet
- Pedro Pablo Kuczynski – 59th president of the Republic of Peru
- Hugh Trevor Lambrick – archaeologist, historian and administrator
- Sir Frederick Lugard – 1st Governor-General of Nigeria and Governor of Hong Kong; also founder of the University of Hong Kong
- Lieutenant General Sir John Nixon – senior officer in the Mesopotamian Campaign of World War I, who was ultimately responsible for the surrender of the British 6th Indian Division at Kut
- Peter Stanley Lyons – Director of Music, Royal Naval College, Greenwich; Master of Choristers and Director of Music, Wells Cathedral and Wells Cathedral School; Headmaster, Witham Hall School
- Charles Kay Ogden – linguist, psychologist, philosopher and author, inventor of Basic English
- Clive Phillipps-Wolley – author and big game hunter, knighted in 1914.
- Brian Redman – 3 times Formula 5000 World Champion. (Drove for Porsche, Ferrari, Aston Martin, Shadow, McLaren, Cooper BRM, and Chevron)
- John Shipley Rowlinson – scientist and historian of science
- Geoffrey Thompson – managing director and owner of Blackpool Pleasure Beach
- Walter Clopton Wingfield – inventor and founder of modern Lawn Tennis.
- Peter Winterbottom – former England Rugby Union captain. He also played for the Lions.
- Arthur Joseph Wrigley – obstetrician and gynaecologist
- Tom Gregory – singer and actor
- The fictional 'Pilot of the Future' Dan Dare was a former pupil, according to biographical details published in the weekly comic Eagle.

=== The Rossallian Club ===
The school also has its own masonic lodge, founded in 1928, that meets three times a year at Freemasons' Hall in London. It is part of the Public School Lodges Council and is open to any male Old Rossallian who wishes to join.

Rossall alumni are among just nine schools to have won The Halford Hewitt golf tournament more than twice. These schools are (in order of victories): Charterhouse (16), Harrow (11), Eton (10), Tonbridge (6), Rugby (5), Watson's (4), Rossall (3), Shrewsbury (3), Merchiston (3). Rossall is also positioned 8th overall in the Anderson Scale of past performances in the competition.

== Lawrence House Astronomy and Space Science Centre ==
The refurbished Rossall Observatory. (Inset – the observatory before restoration)

Rossall is also home to the Lawrence House Astronomy and Space Science Centre – the only centre dedicated solely to the teaching of astronomy. The project consists of the telescope in Rossall's Assheton Observatory as well as a building of its own containing a lecture theatre, classrooms and a portable planetarium. The telescope is of particular note – being 12 feet (3.7 m) long, 18 inches wide and dating from 1870. The objective diameter of the telescope is 6.5 inches and it has a focal length of f/13.5. The project has been funded by the Lawrence House Trust and predominantly run by Nick Lister, originally the head of design and technology at the school and now Astronomer in Residence. Lister is a fellow of the Royal Astronomical Society and was appointed as vice-president of the Association for Astronomy Education, where he succeeded Dr Robert Massey, who became president of the organisation.

When initial assessments were being made for the feasibility of restoring the observatory, both the telescope and observatory were in a poor condition as a result of years of neglect and an arson attempt by some local children. The telescope is made predominantly from brass and thus suffered minimal corrosion and damage. Most importantly the lens of the telescope survived unscathed allowing for restoration. This was carried out at first by several dedicated parents and governors of the school, amongst them Syd Little. Soon after the basic restoration ideas were raised for a larger project allowing the teaching of astronomy on a larger scale. After getting clearance from the original owners of the telescope to go ahead with the project, Rossall was given funds from the Lawrence House Trust, an educational charity, to go forward with their plans. The centre had an official opening on 26 September 2006 with Old Rossallian and former Astronomer Royal Sir Francis Graham Smith in attendance.

== Arms ==
Coat of arms of Rossall School
Escutcheon Argent on a pale Gules between four roses of the last a mitre Or between two open books Proper. Motto Mens Agitat Molem
