= William Beechey =

English painter (1753–1839)

Sir William Beechey RA
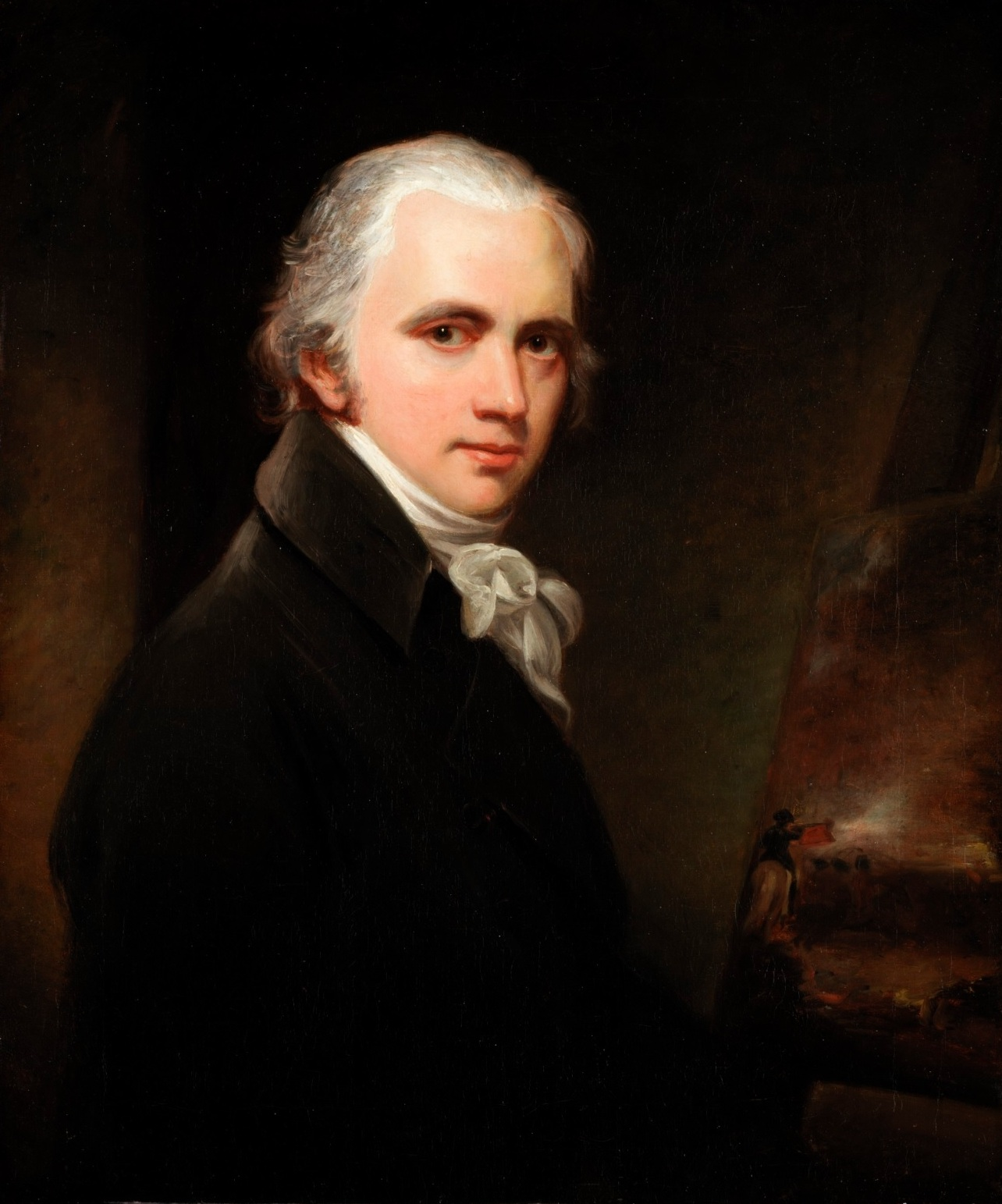
- Self-portrait, c. 1800
- Born: 12 December 1753; Burford, Oxfordshire, England
- Died: 28 January 1839 (aged 85); London, England
- Known for: Painting
- Spouses: Mary Ann Jones; Anne Phyllis Jessop
- Children: Henry; Frederick; George; St. Vincent; Richard

Sir William Beechey RA (12 December 1753 – 28 January 1839) was a British portraitist during the golden age of British painting.

== Early life ==
Beechey was born at Burford, Oxfordshire, on 12 December 1753, the son of William Beechey, a solicitor, and his wife Hannah Read. Both parents died when he was still quite young in the early 1760s, and he and his siblings were brought up by his uncle Samuel, a solicitor who lived in nearby Chipping Norton.

The uncle was determined that the young Beechey should likewise follow a career in the law, and at an appropriate age he was entered as a clerk with a conveyancer near Stow-on-the-Wold. But as The Monthly Mirror later recorded in July 1798, he was: "Early foredoomed his [uncle's] soul to cross/ And paint a picture where he should engross".

== Career ==
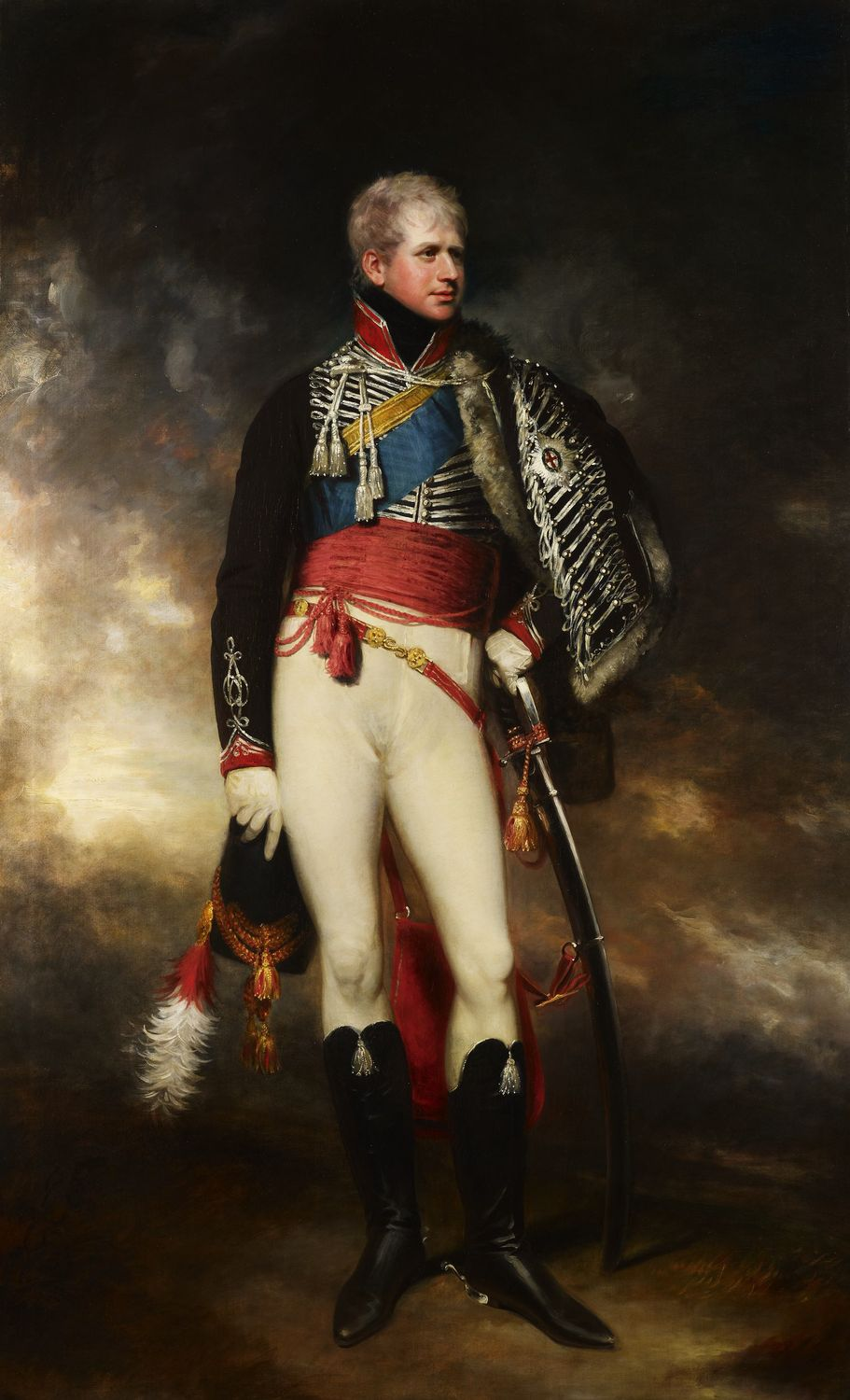
Prince Ernest, later King of Hanover (1771–1851), by William Beechey, c. 1797–1802

Beechey was admitted to the Royal Academy Schools in 1772, where he is thought to have studied under Johan Zoffany. He first exhibited at the Academy in 1776. His earliest surviving portraits are small-scale full-length and conversation pieces which are reminiscent of Zoffany. In 1782, he moved to Norwich, where he gained several commissions, including a portrait of John Wodehouse and a series of civic portraits for St. Andrew's Hall, Norwich. By 1787, he had returned to London, and in 1789, he exhibited a celebrated portrait of John Douglas, Bishop of Carlisle (now in Lambeth Palace). Beechey's career during this period is marked by a succession of adept and restrained portraits in the tradition of Joshua Reynolds.

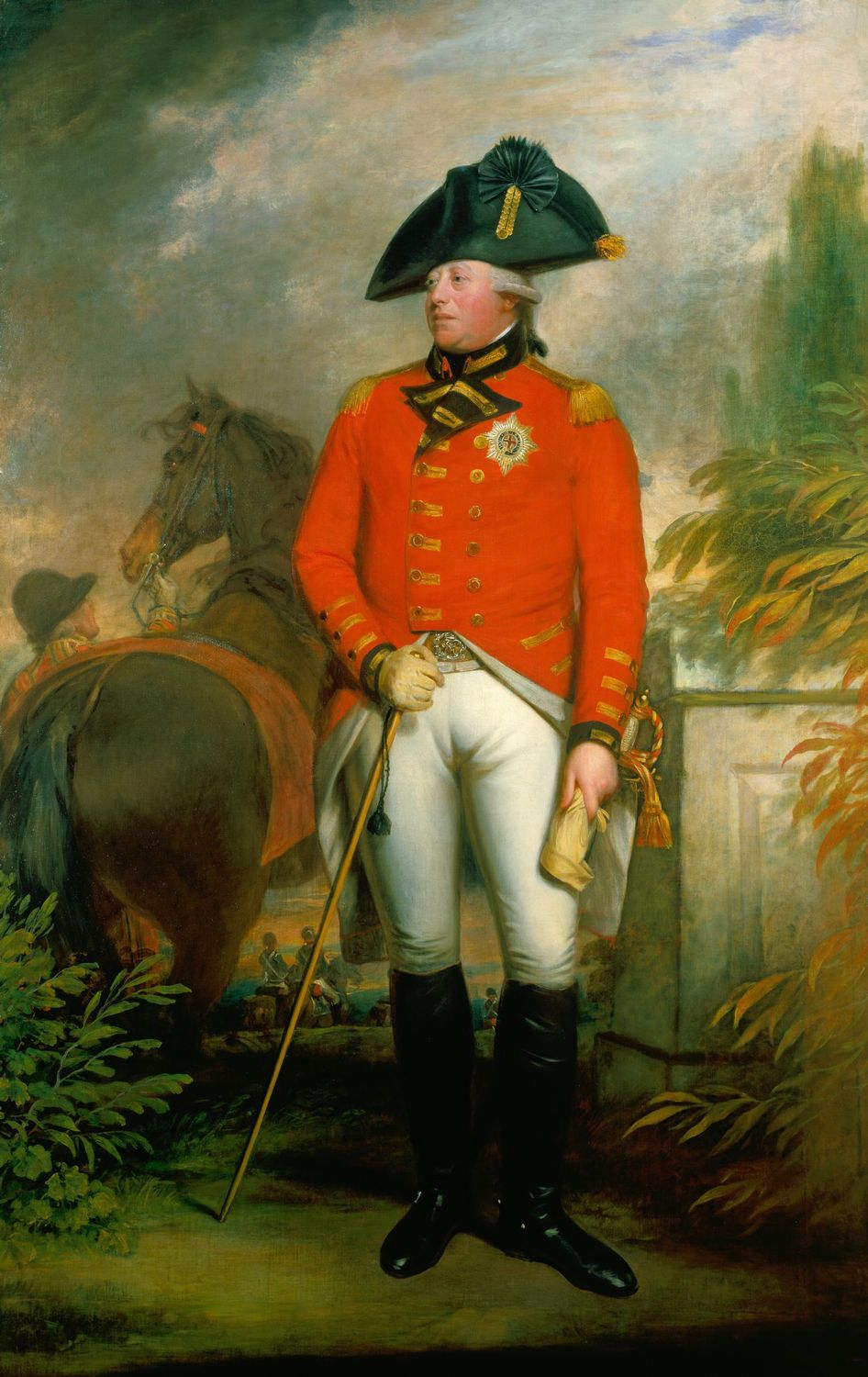
King George III, by William Beechey, 1799–1800

Beechey's style perfectly suited the conventional taste of the royal family, and in 1793, he was commissioned to paint a full-length portrait of Queen Charlotte and subsequently named as her official portrait painter. That same year, he was elected as an associate member of the Royal Academy.

Following his royal appointment, the number of royal commissions he undertook increased markedly, and in 1797 he exhibited six royal portraits. In 1798, he was elected a full member of the Royal Academy and painted George III and the Prince of Wales Reviewing Troops for that year's academy's exhibition. This enormous composition depicts King George III, the Prince of Wales and staff officers on horseback at an imagined cavalry review in Hyde Park. The King was reported to be delighted with the painting and rewarded Beechey with a knighthood.

Joseph Farington's Diaries give many accounts of Beechey's relations with the royal family during this period, including his temporary fall from favour in 1804, which Farington attributes to the vagaries of George III's mental condition.

Beechey's portraits of the turn of the century are considered to be his most colourful and lively. They are closer to the flamboyant and free techniques employed by his younger rivals, John Hoppner and Sir Thomas Lawrence.

Royal patronage resumed in around 1813, when Beechey was appointed portrait painter to Prince William Frederick, Duke of Gloucester and Edinburgh, and culminated with his appointment in 1830 as principal portrait painter to William IV. In 1830, he stood for election as President of the Royal Academy following the death of Thomas Lawrence, finishing second to Martin Archer Shee. In 1836, Beechey retired to Hampstead and on 9–11 June that year, the contents of his studio along with his collection were sold at Christie's.

Although capable of impetuousness and irascibility, Beechey was known for his generosity to students. In particular, he took a close interest in the career of the young John Constable.

== Subjects ==
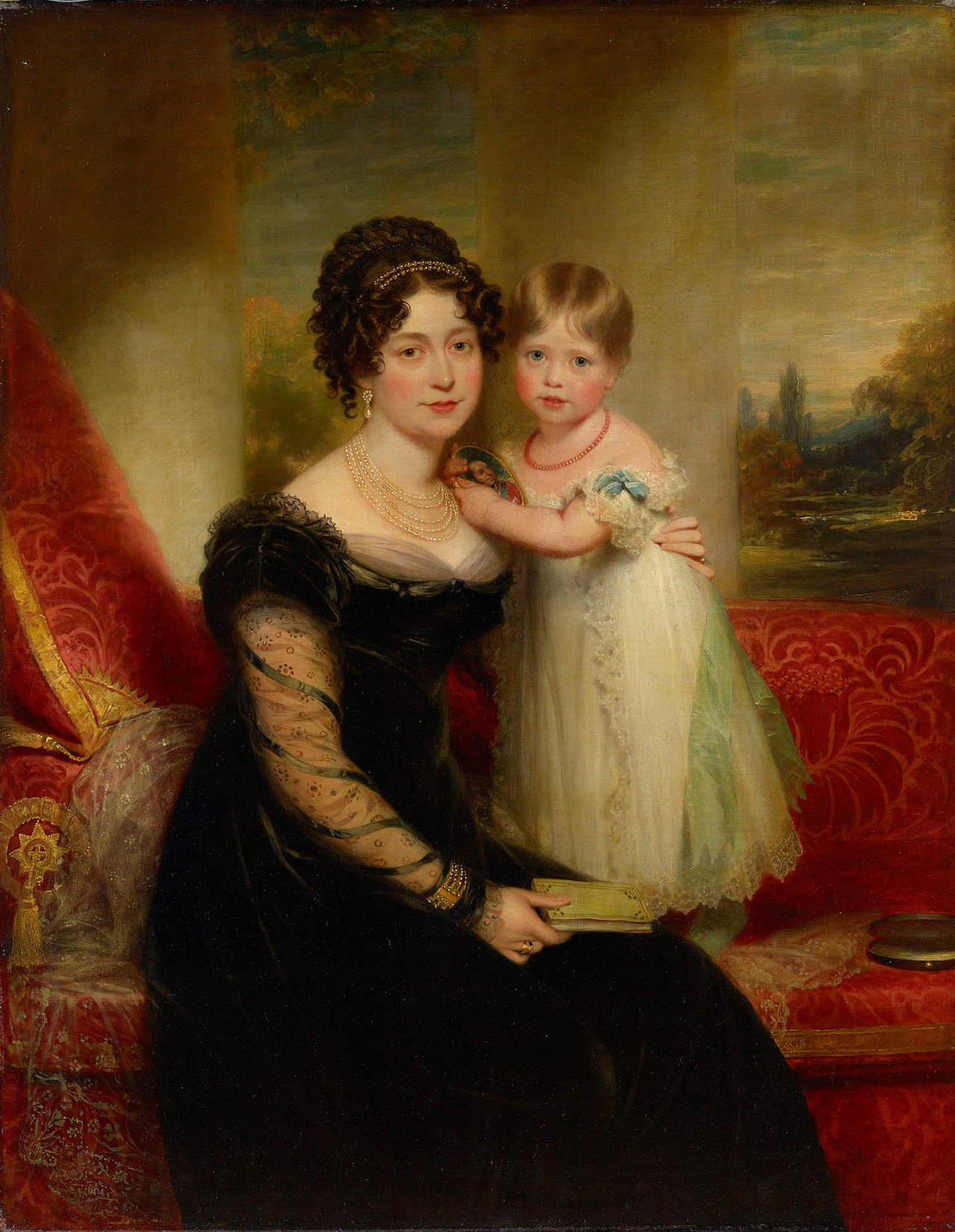
Beechey's Victoria, Duchess of Kent with Princess Victoria at Kensington Palace, 1821

During a prolific career spanning half a century, Beechey painted many of the leading figures of his day. His sitters included:

Royalty and Prime Ministers	Political figures	Others
George III; George IV; William IV; Princess, later Queen Victoria; Prince Ernest, later King of Hanover; Queen Charlotte; Prince Adolphus, Duke of Cambridge; Prince William Henry, Duke of Gloucester and Edinburgh; Prince Edward, Duke of Kent; Prince William Frederick, Duke of Gloucester and Edinburgh; Princess Mary, Duchess of Gloucester and Edinburgh; Henry Addington, 1st Viscount Sidmouth, prime minister; Spencer Perceval, prime pinister; Arthur Wellesley, 1st Duke of Wellington, prime minister	Henry Phipps, 1st Earl of Mulgrave, foreign secretary; Warren Hastings, governor-general of India; James Cecil, 1st Marquess of Salisbury, statesman; Henry Paget, 1st Marquess of Anglesey, field marshal; Horatio Nelson, 1st Viscount Nelson, admiral; John Jervis, 1st Earl of St Vincent, admiral; Charles Cornwallis, 1st Marquess Cornwallis, general; George Montagu, 1st Duke of Montagu; George Douglas, 16th Earl of Morton; John Wodehouse, 1st Baron Wodehouse	Sarah Siddons, actress; John Philip Kemble, actor; Sir David Wilkie, artist; Paul Sandby, artist; John Carr, architect; Edward Hodges Baily, sculptor; Joseph Nollekens, sculptor; James Watt, inventor; Sir Everard Home, Bt, surgeon; Sir James Earle, surgeon; Thomas Coutts, banker; Philip Meadows Martineau, surgeon and Lord of the manor of Carrow; Edward Maltby, Bishop of Durham; John Douglas, Bishop of Salisbury

In his 1978 novel Desolation Island, Patrick O'Brian wrote that Capt. Jack Aubrey had been painted by Beechey. The portrait, which showed Aubrey in Royal Navy uniform wearing the insignia of the Order of the Bath, hung in his home, Ashgrove Cottage.

== Family ==
William Beechey's first marriage was to Mary Ann Jones (c. 1760–1793) in 1772 (other sources say 1778). Their children included British painter and Egyptologist Henry William Beechey (1788–1862).

Following his first wife's death, Beechey married the successful miniature painter Anne Phyllis Jessop (1764–1833) in 1793. They had many children together, including: Royal Navy captain, geographer, and politician Frederick William Beechey (1796–1856); painter George Duncan Beechey (1798–1852); clergyman St. Vincent Beechey (1806–1899); and painter and admiral in the British navy Richard Brydges Beechey (1808–1895).

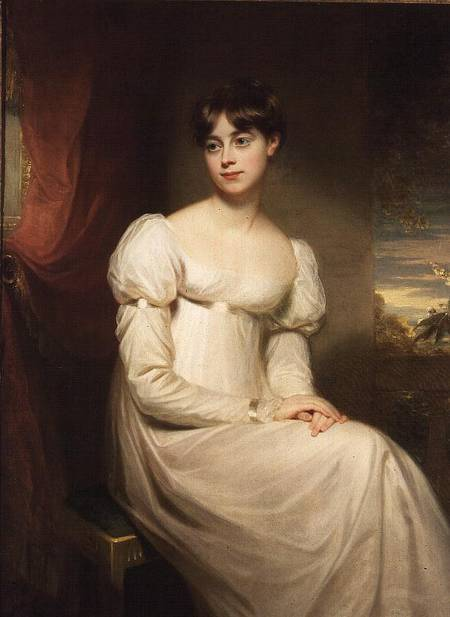
Miss Harriet Beechey,
by William Beechey, c. 1800

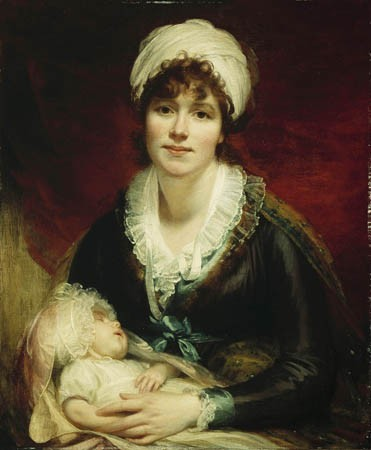
Anne Jessop, Lady Beechey, by William Beechey, c. 1800

== Prices at auction ==
Beechey's Portrait of James Watt sold for £153,440 at Sotheby's on 20 March 2003. His Portrait of Mirza Abu'l Hassan Khan, Envoy Extraordinary and Minister Plenipotentiary to the Court of King George III sold for £181,600 at Christie's on 8 June 2006. His Portrait of George Douglas, 16th Earl of Morton in the dress of the Royal Company of Archers sold for £481,250 at Christie's on 5 July 2011. His portrait of The Dashwood Children sold at auction for $821,000 including premium at Christie's on 29 January 2014.

== Gallery ==
Beechey's works are represented in many of the world's leading collections, including the Louvre, the Smithsonian Institution, the Royal Collection, the Royal Academy of Arts, the National Portrait Gallery, London, the Tate and the Metropolitan Museum of Art.

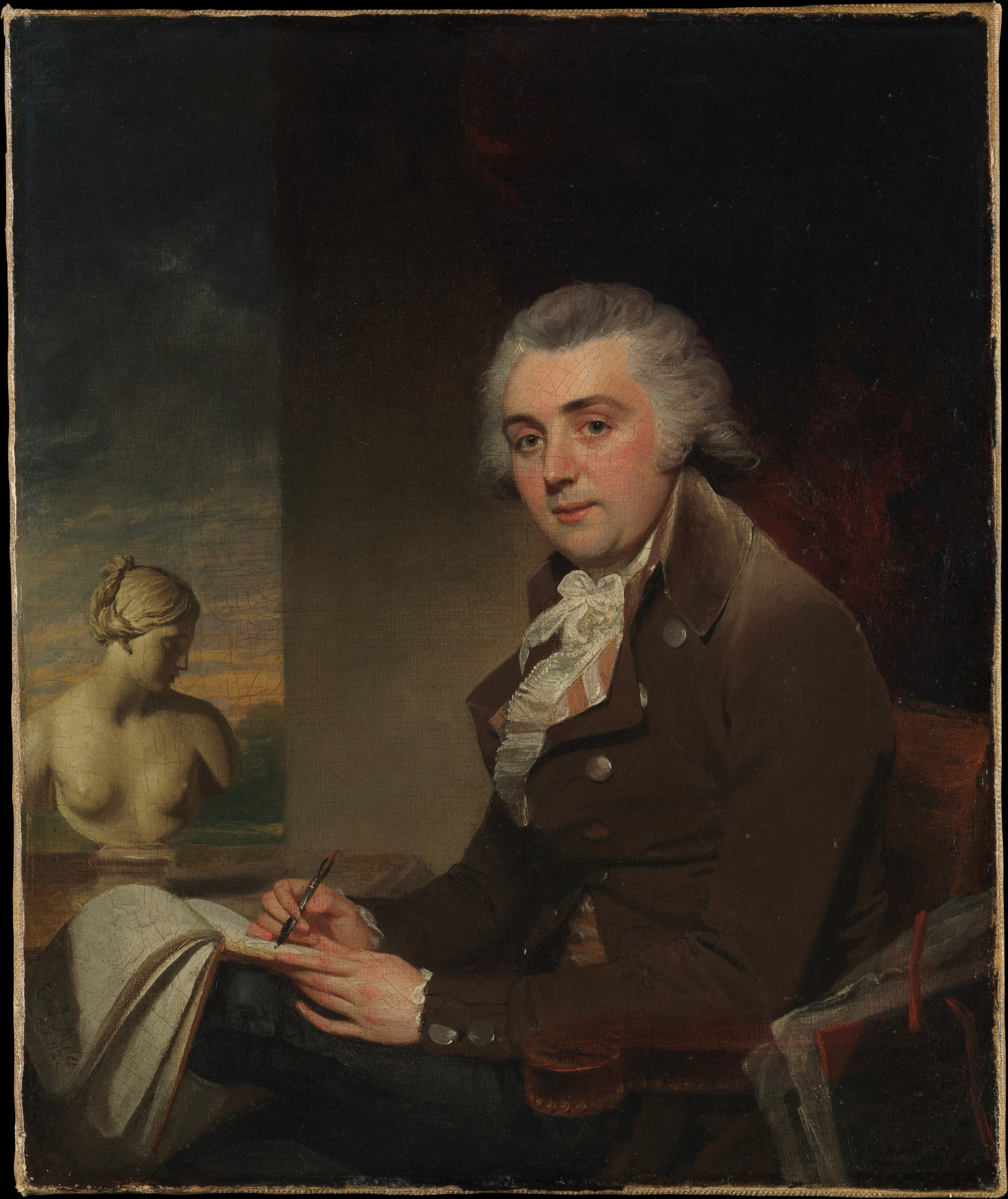
Portrait of Edward Miles, 1785

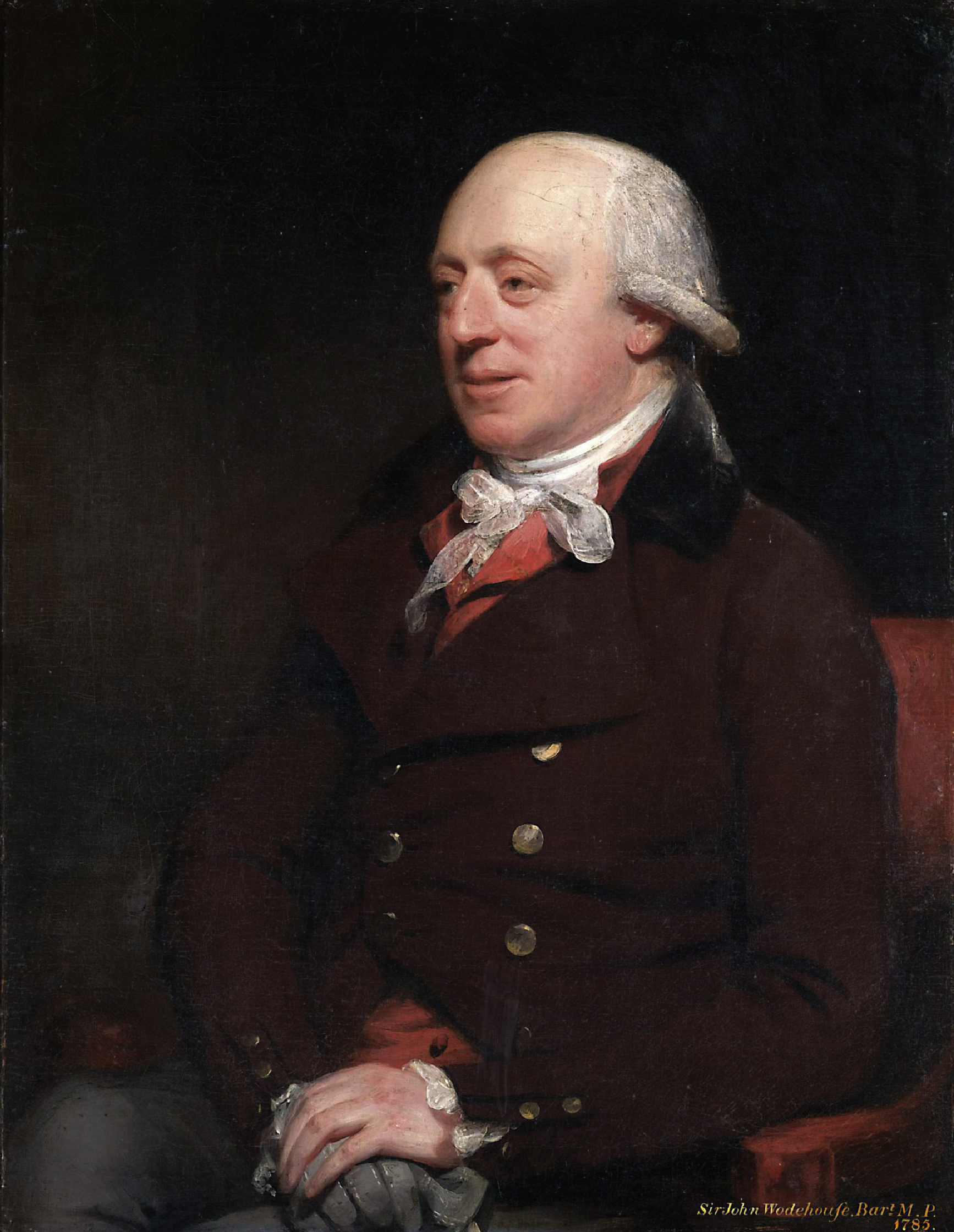
Sir John Wodehouse, 1785

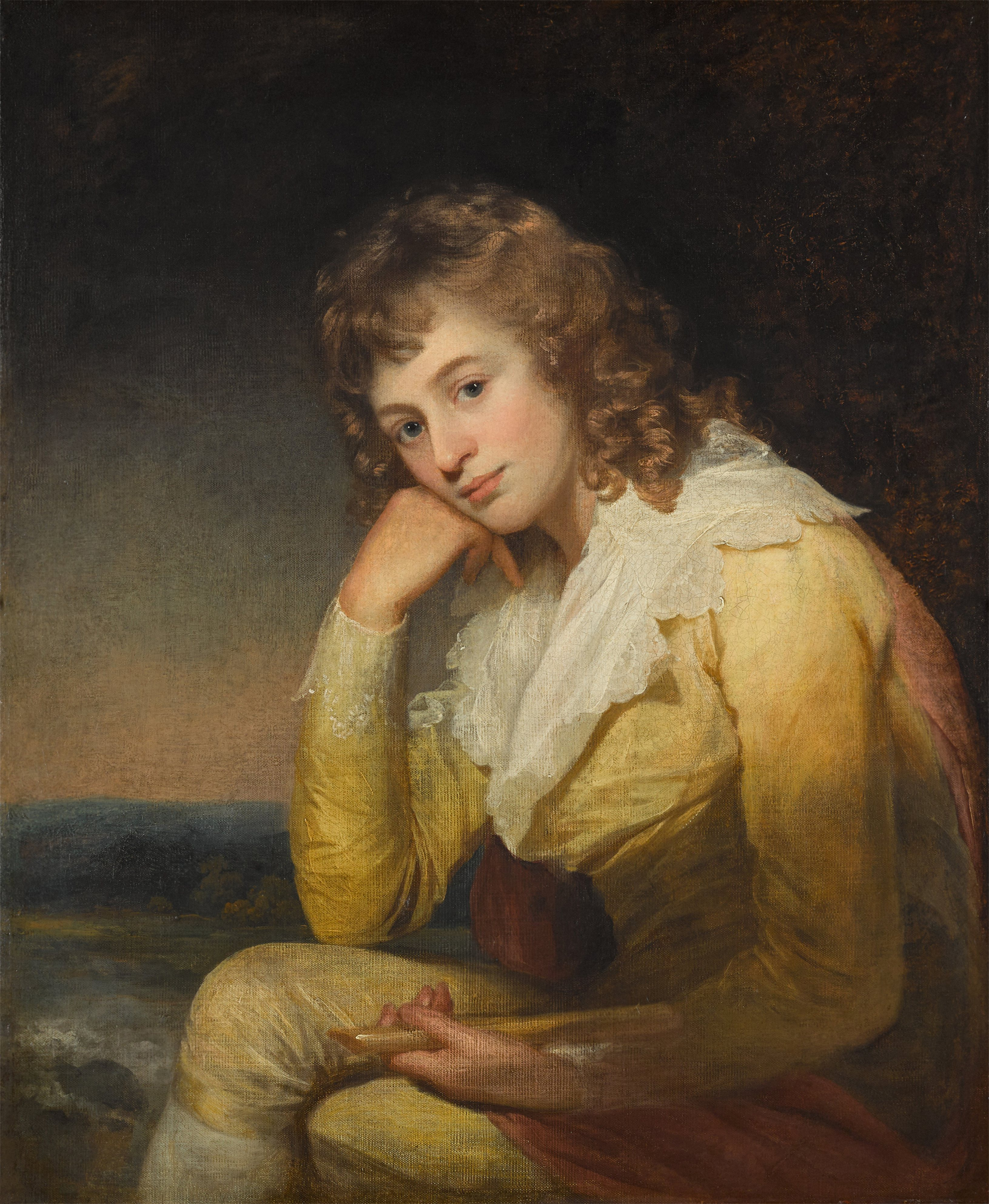
Dorothea Jordan as Rosalind, 1787

Admiral Jervis, 1787

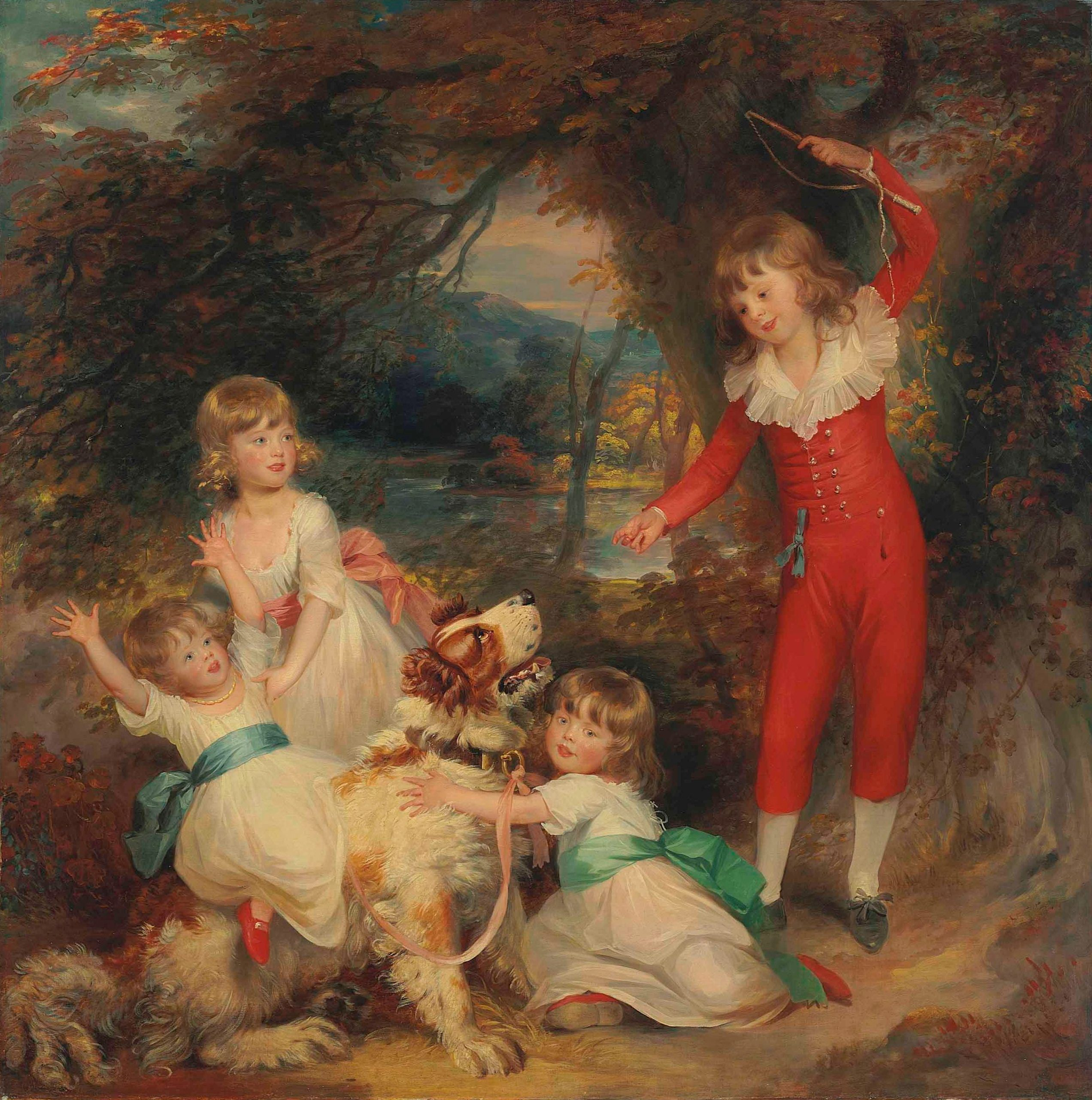
The Dashwood Children, c. 1789

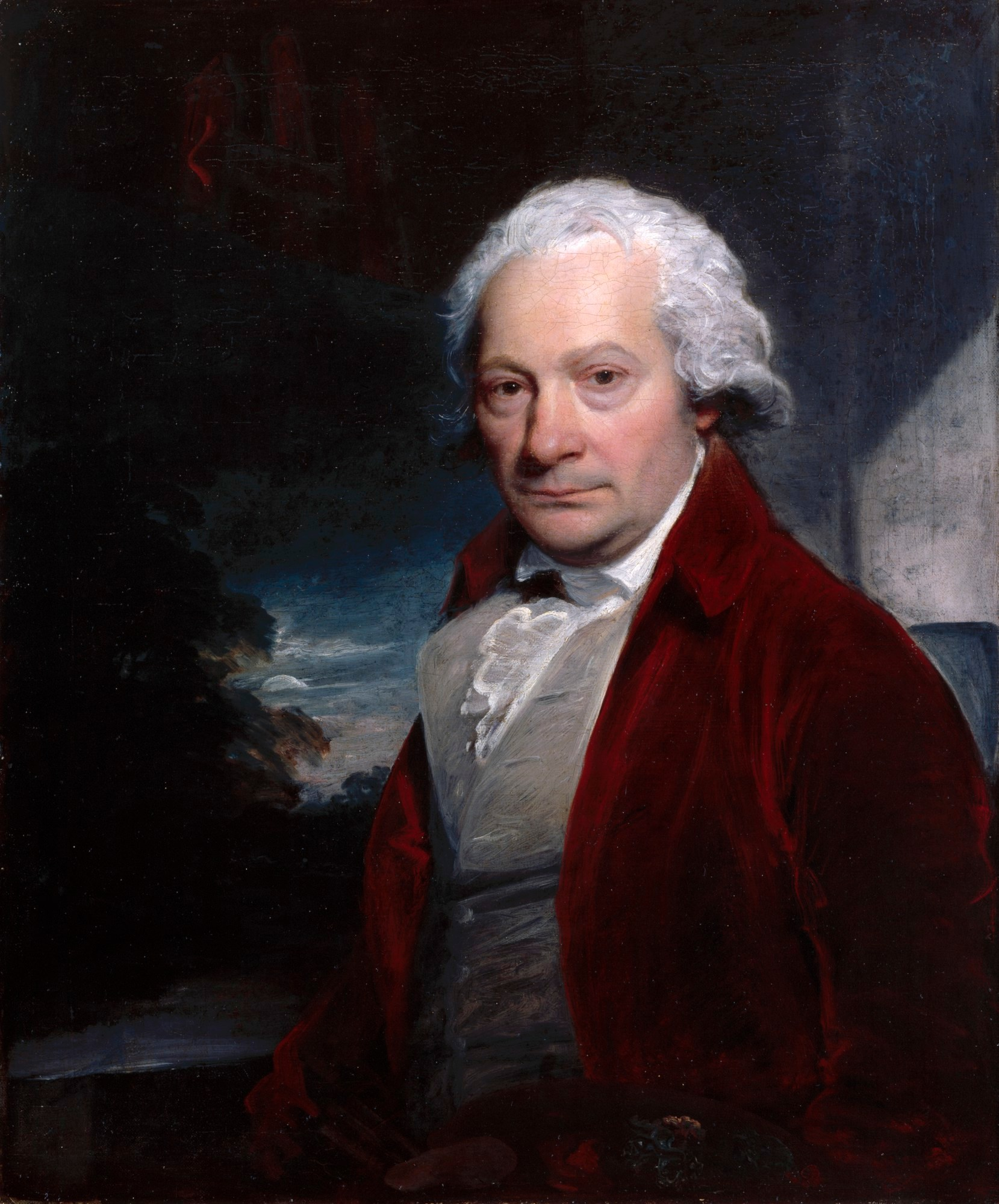
Paul Sandby, c. 1789

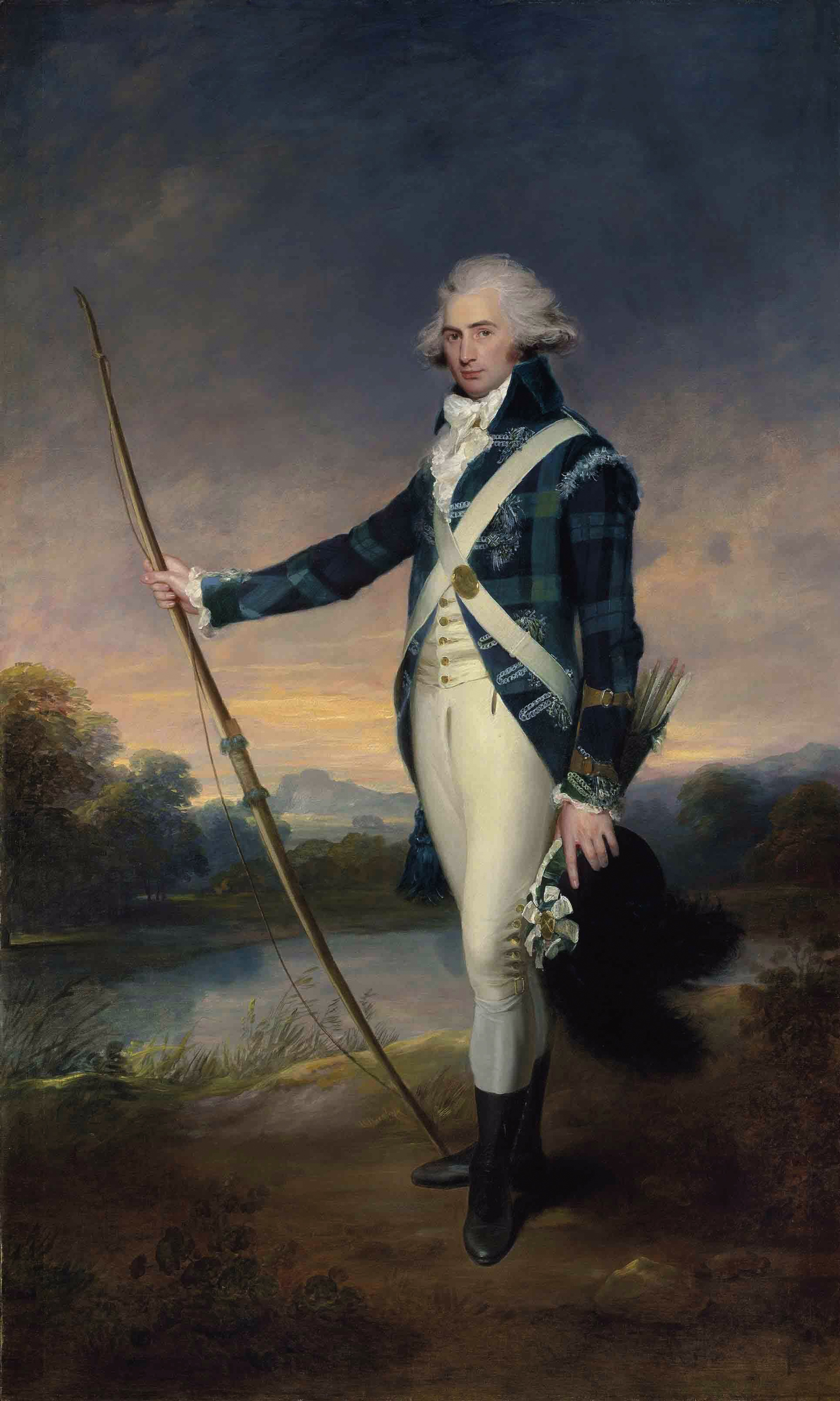
George Douglas, 16th Earl of Morton (1761–1827), c. 1790

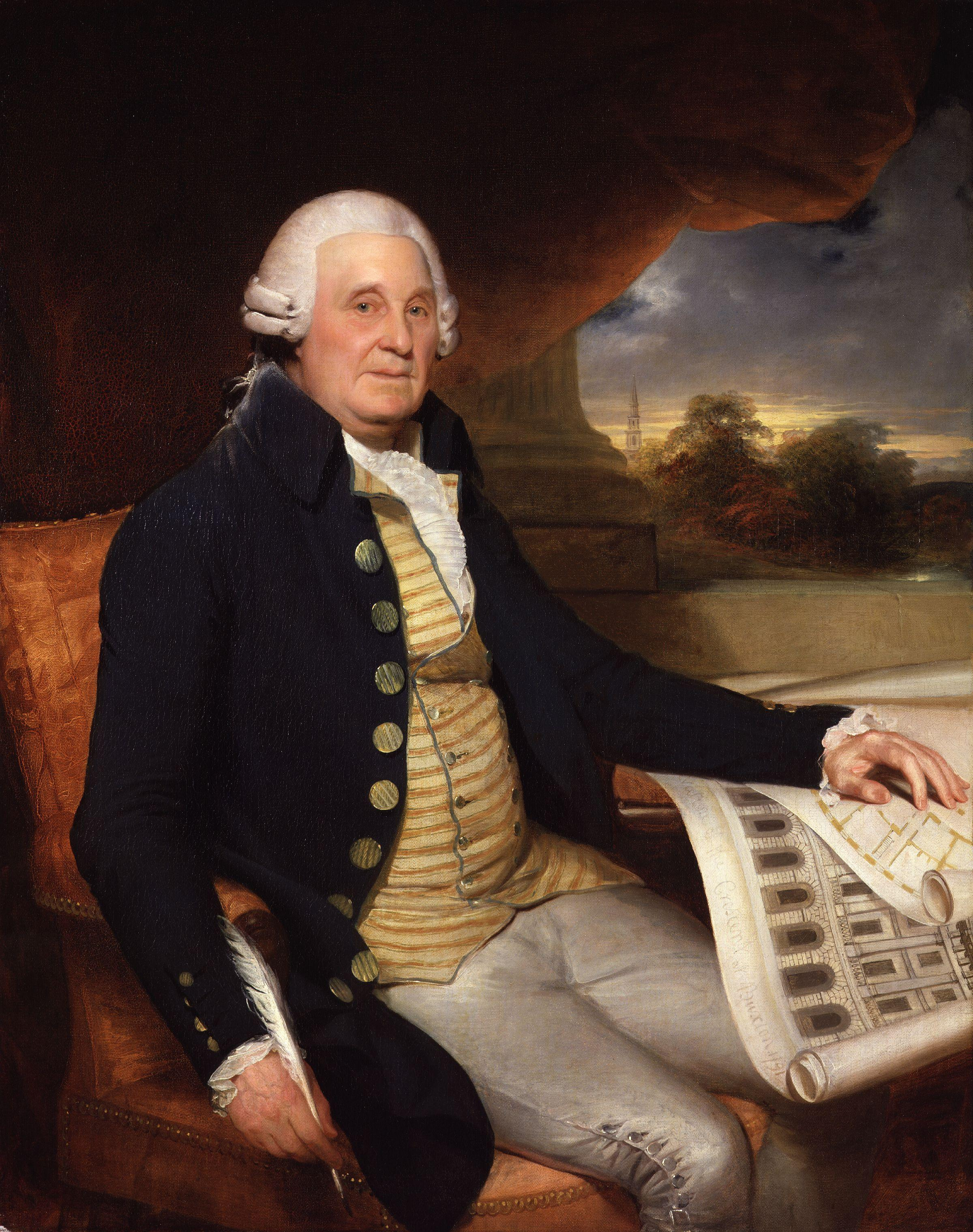
Portrait of John Carr, 1791

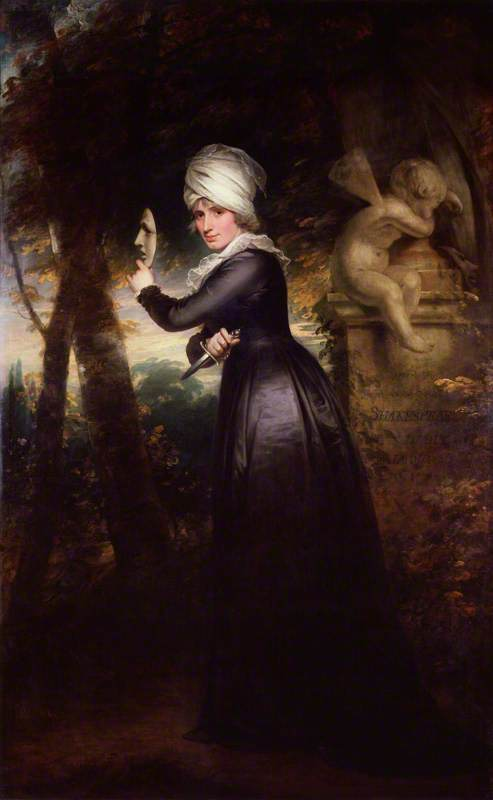
Sarah Siddons with the Emblems of Tragedy, 1793

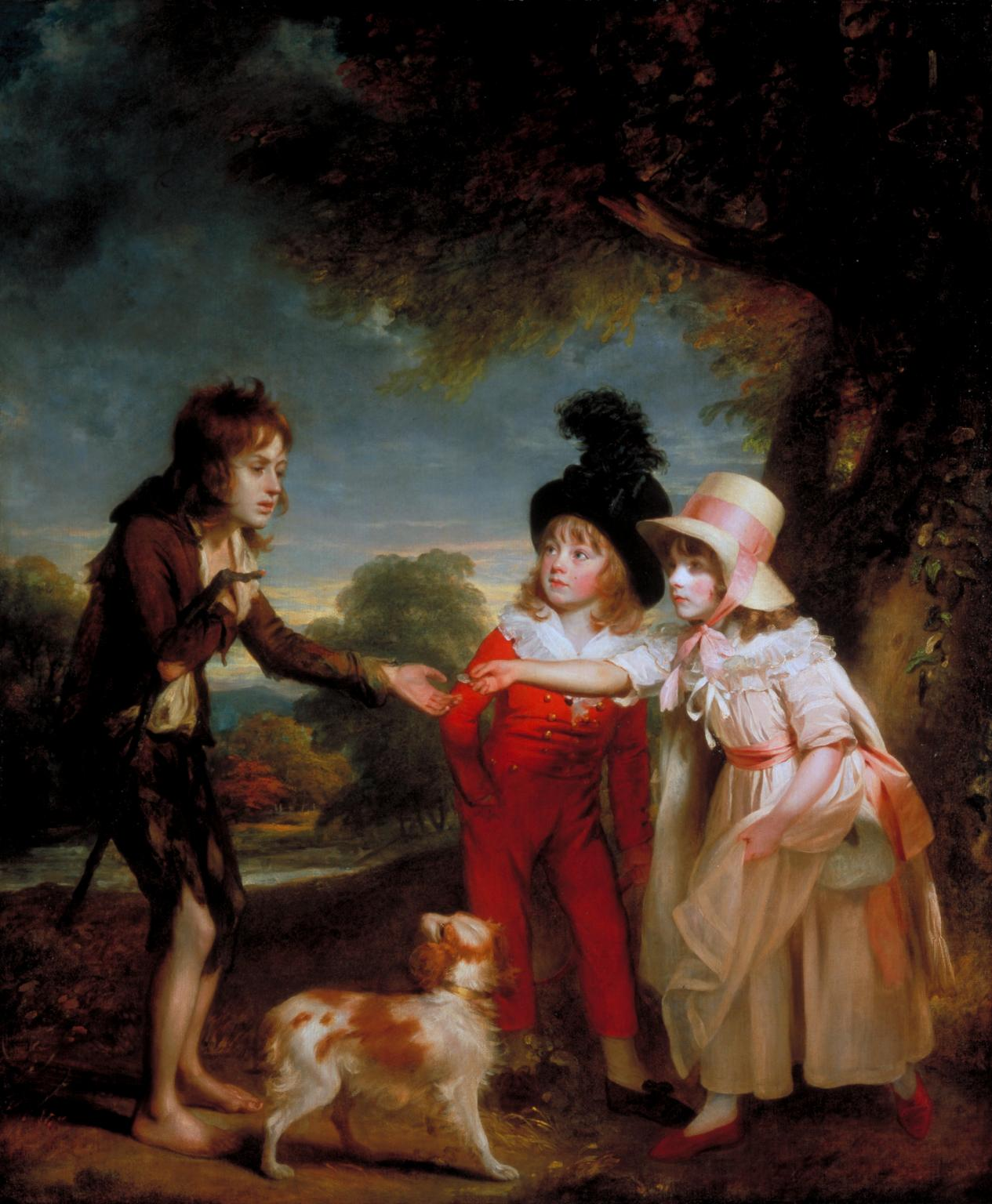
Sir Francis Ford's Children Giving a Coin to a Beggar Boy, 1793

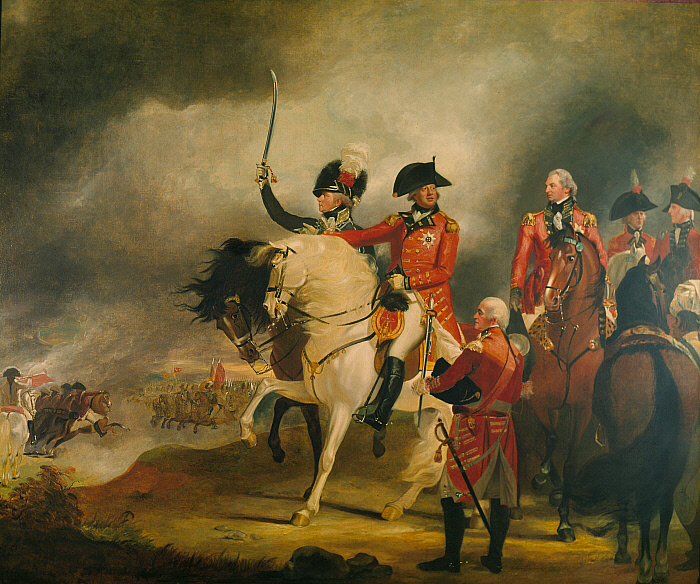
King George III Reviewing the Prince of Wales' Regiment of Light Dragoons, Attended by the Prince of Wales, the Duke of York and Other General Officers (c.1794), Oil on canvas, 46 5/16 x 56 3/16 in. (117.6 x 142.7 cm), Clark Art Institute

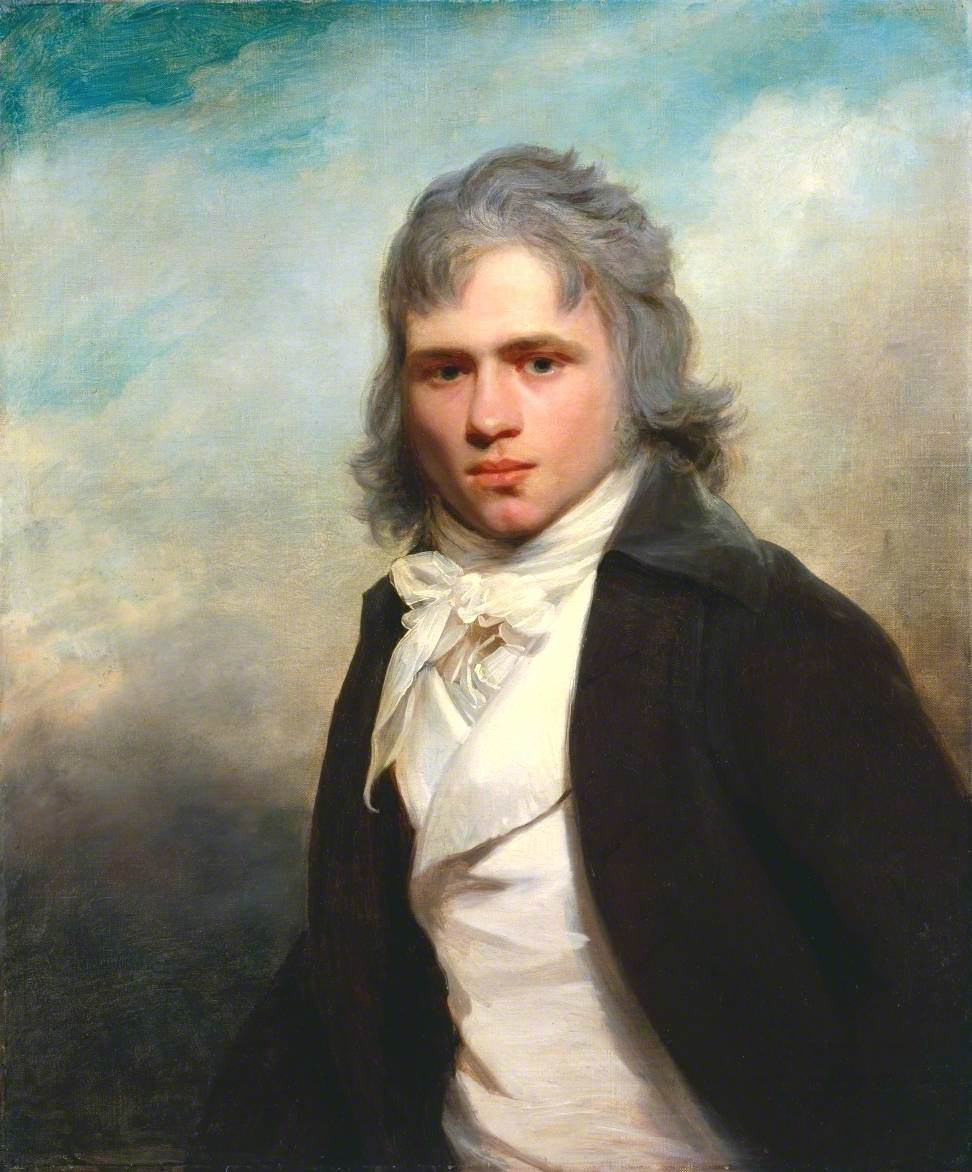
Thomas Law Hodges, 1795

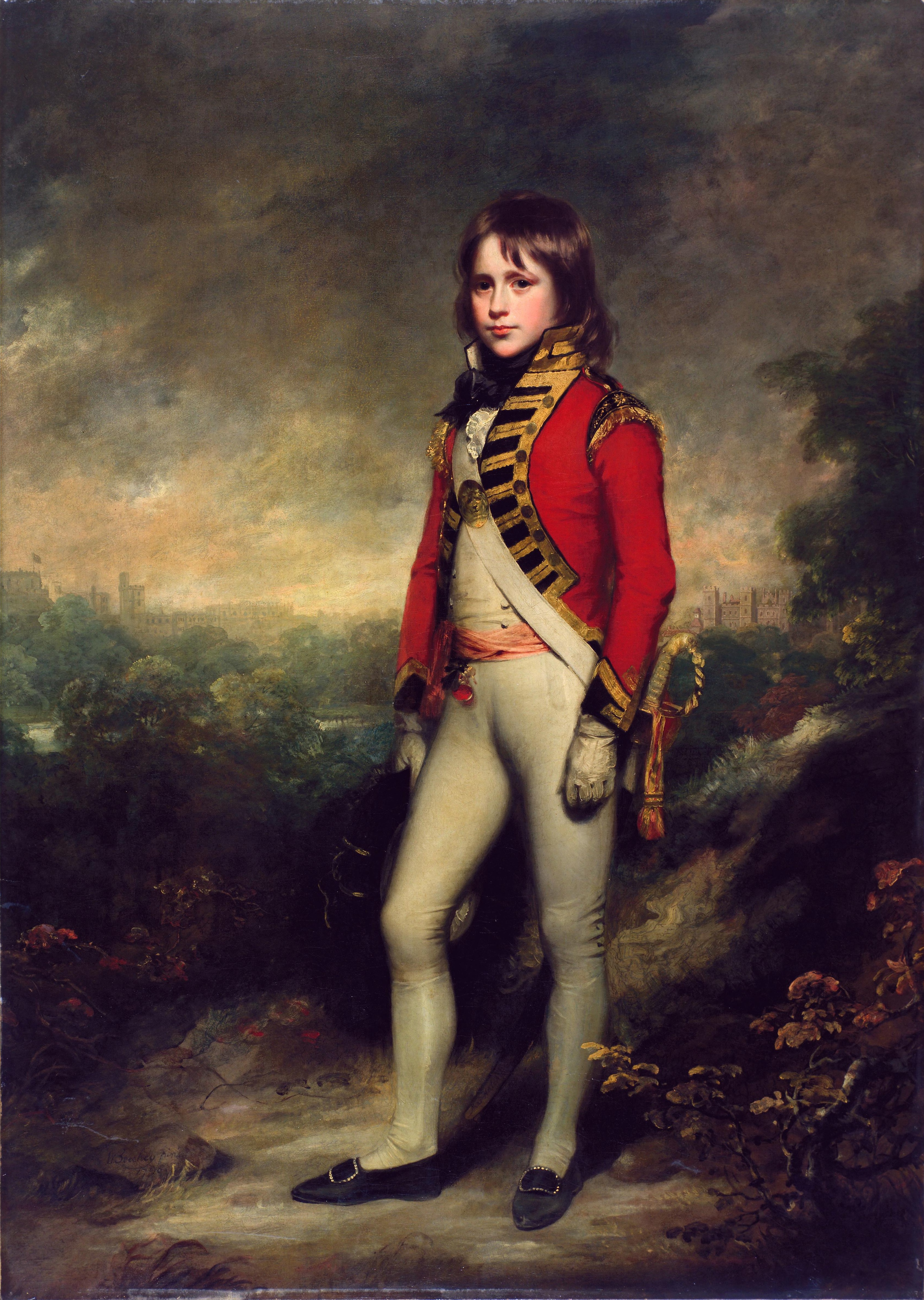
Master James Hatch, 1796

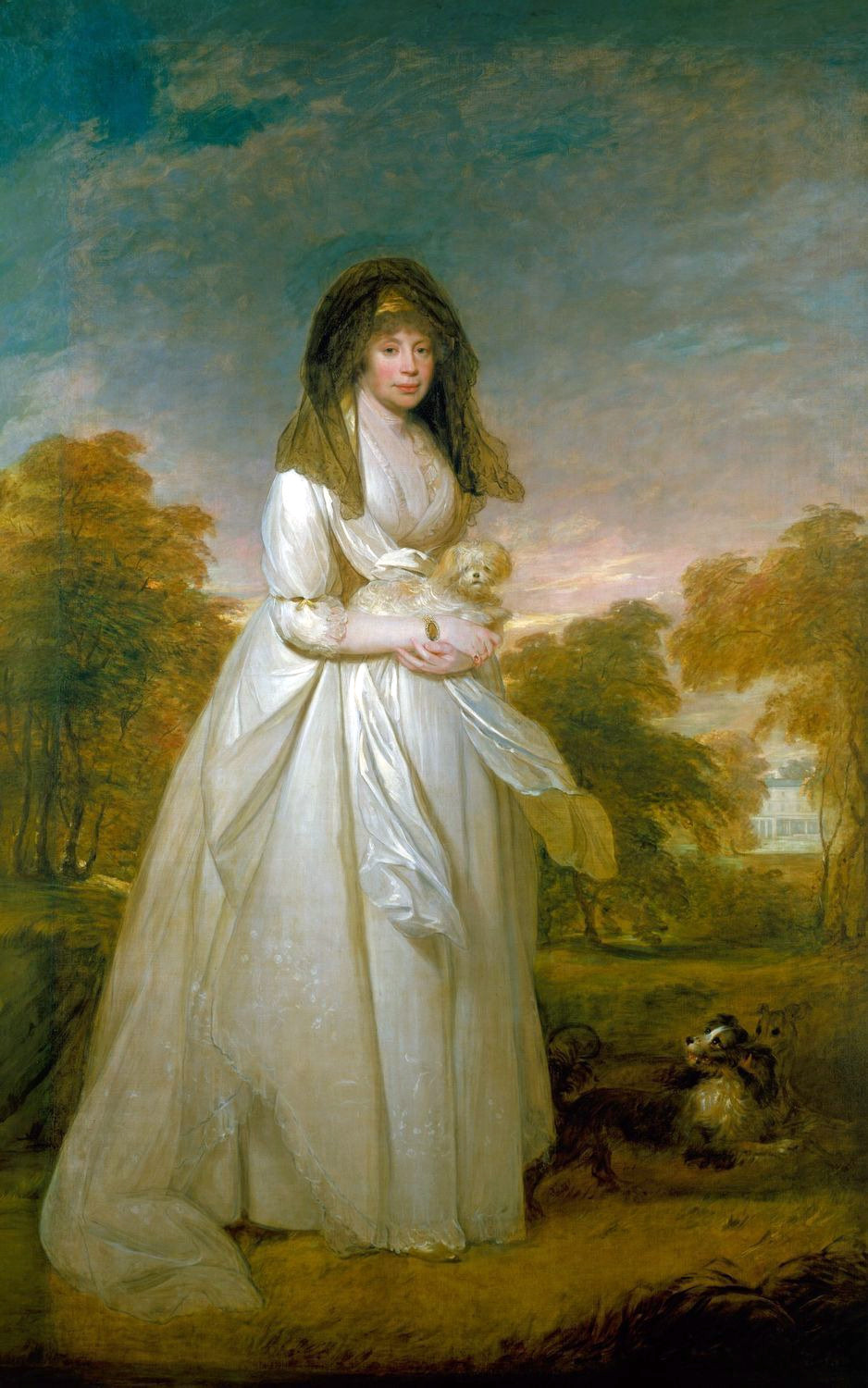
Portrait of Queen Charlotte, 1796

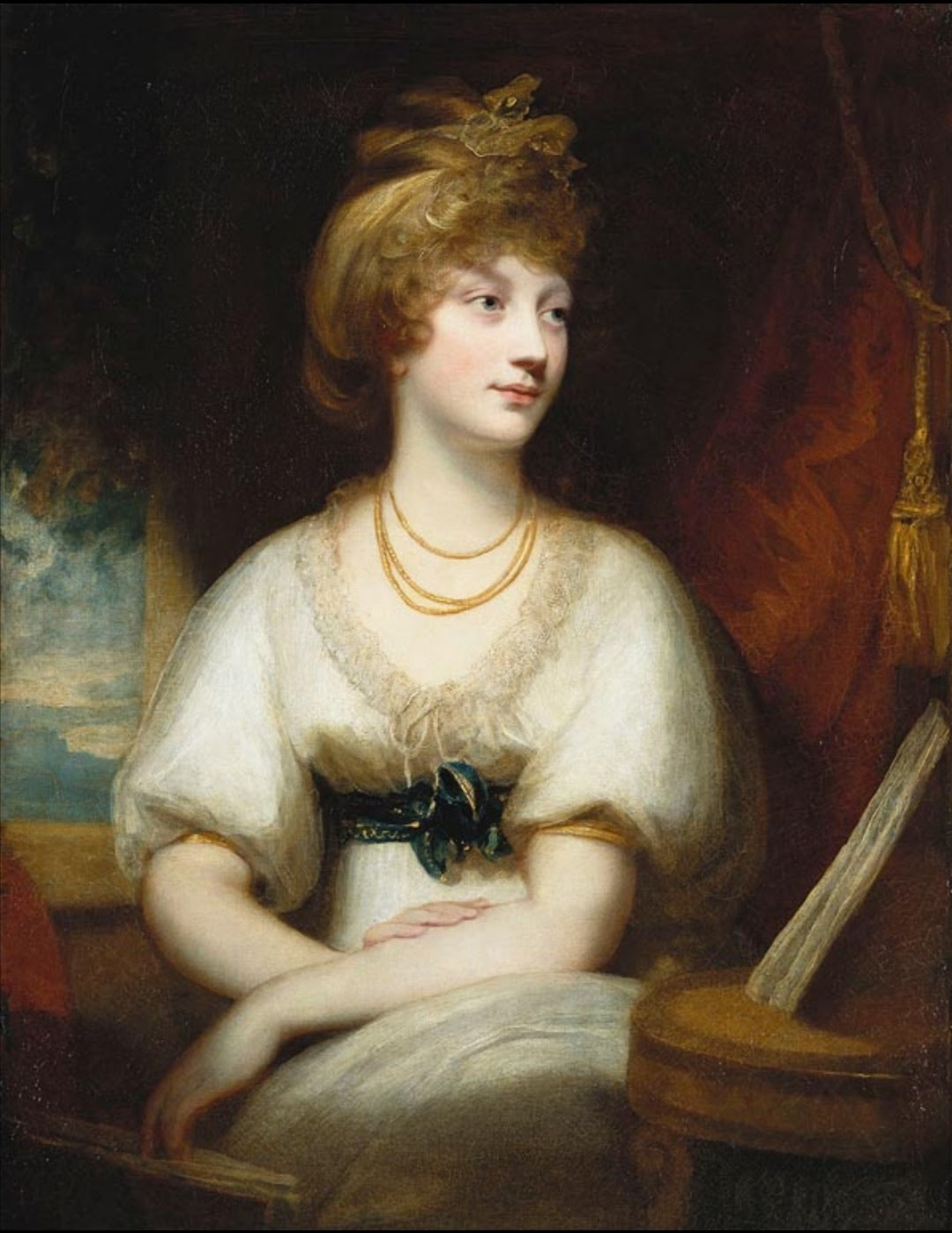
Princess Amelia, 1797

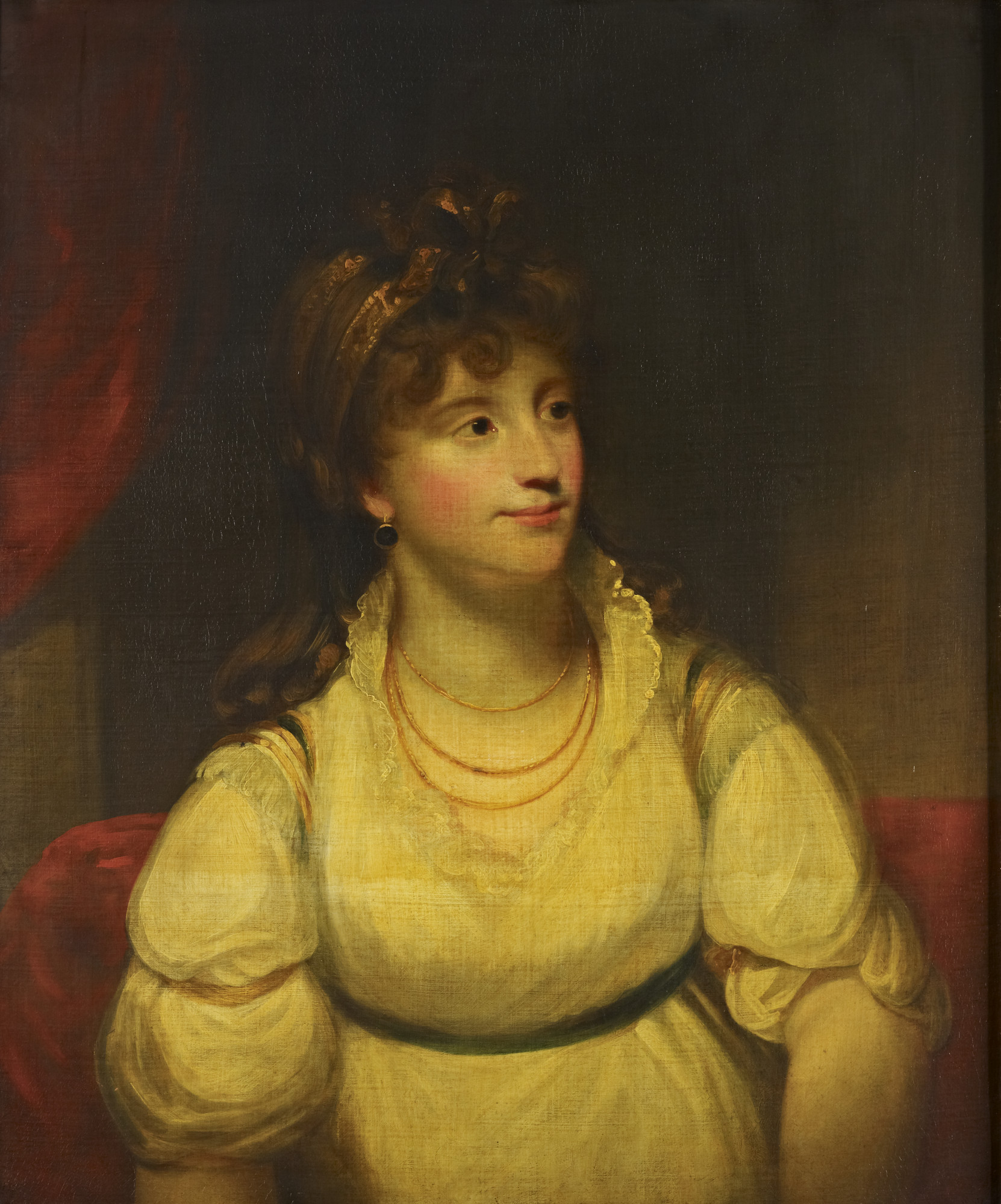
Frederica, Duchess of York, 1797

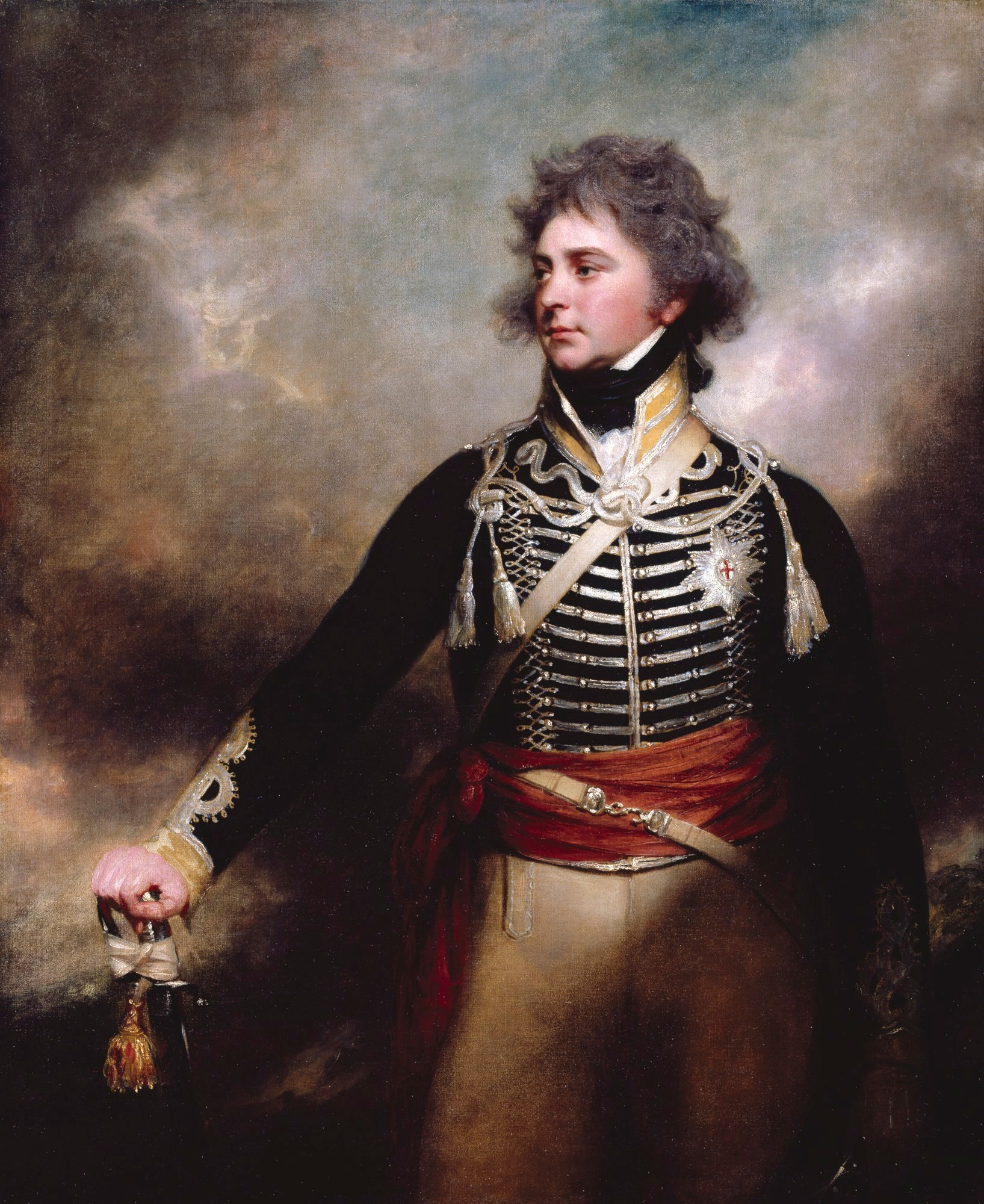
Portrait of George, Prince of Wales, c. 1798

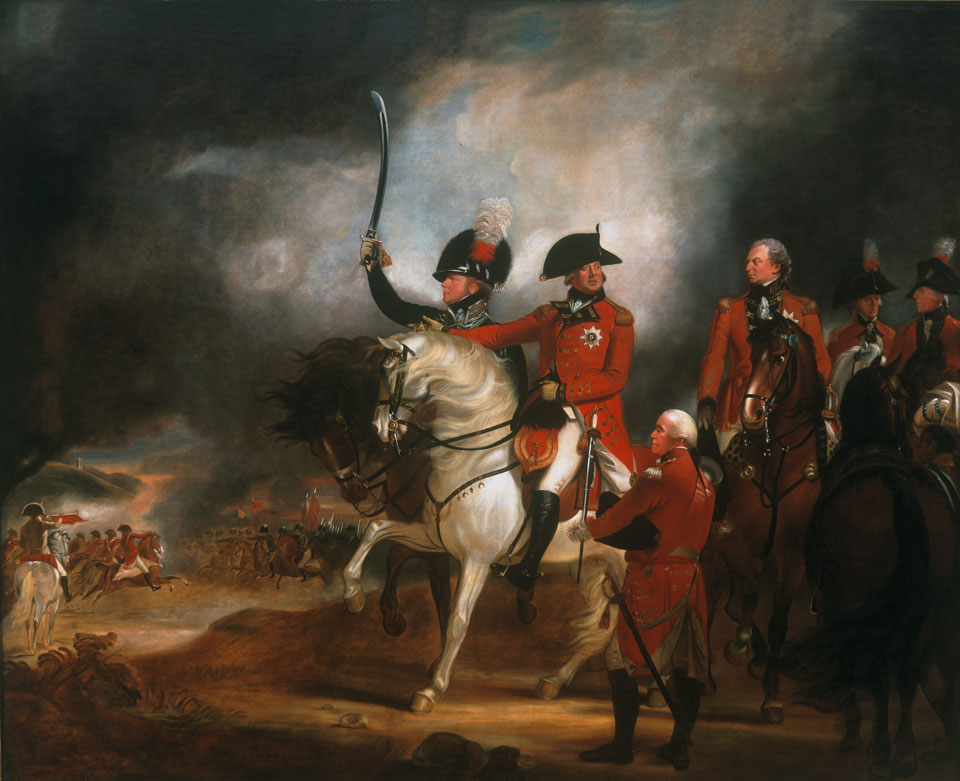
George III and the Prince of Wales Reviewing Troops, 1798

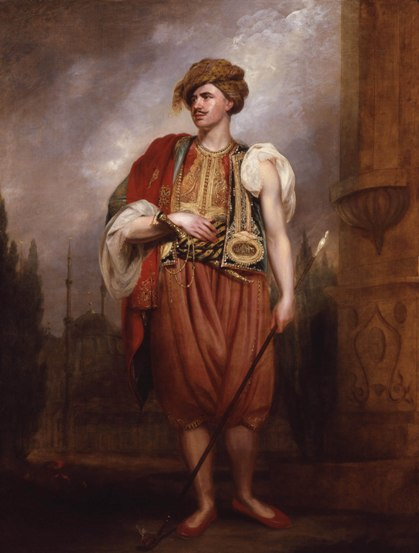
Portrait of Thomas Hope, 1798

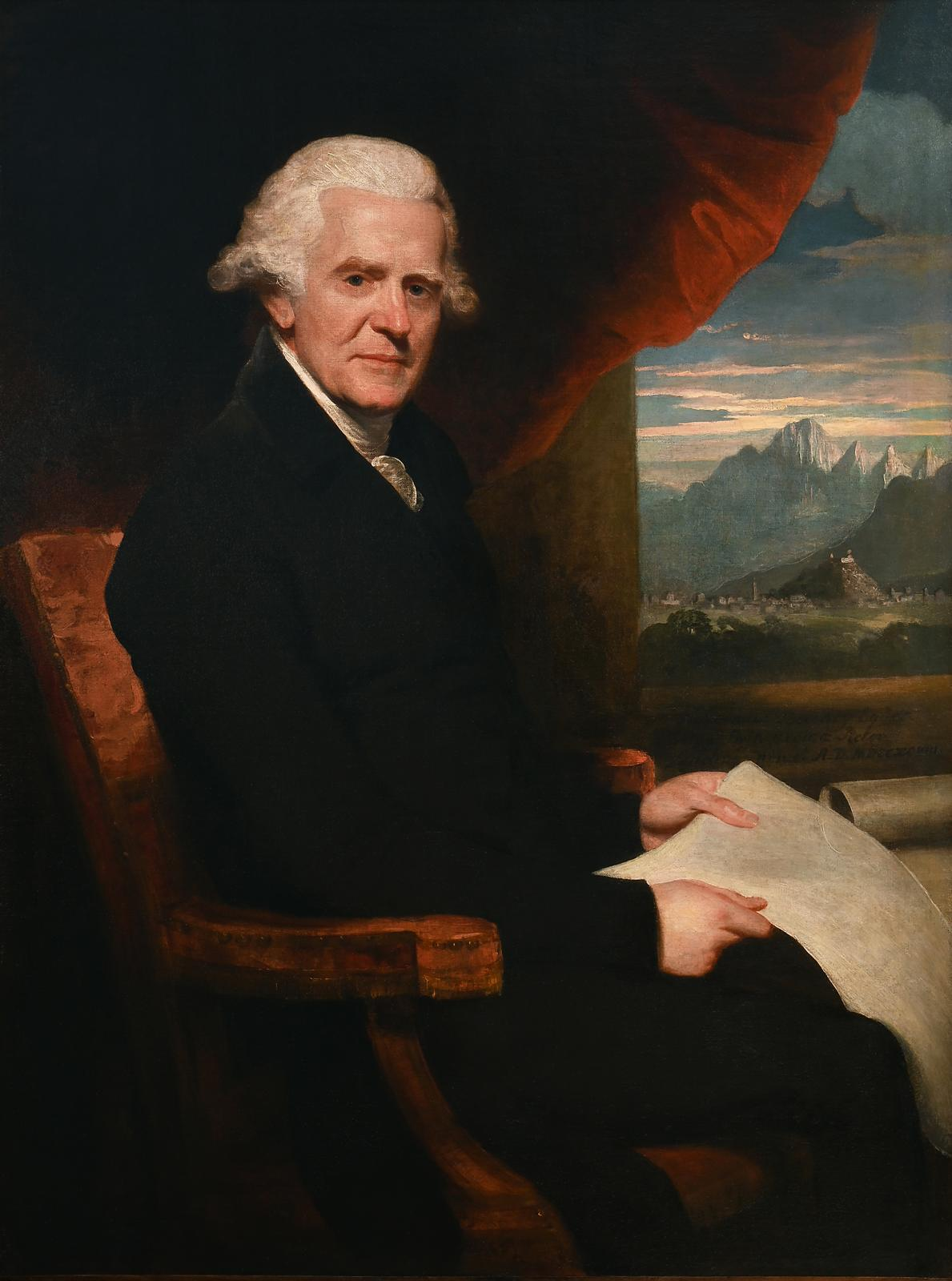
Pasquale Paoli, 1798

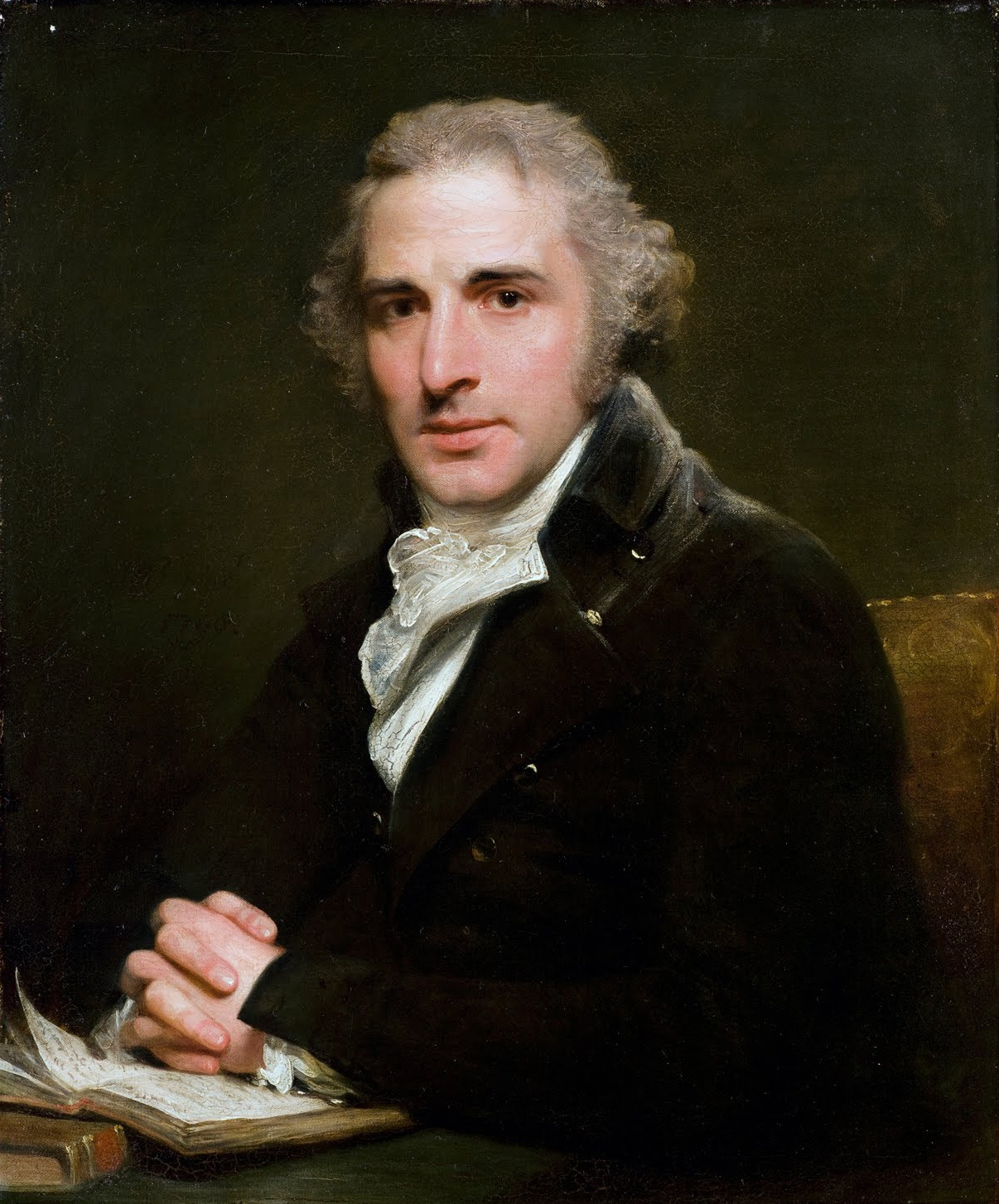
Portrait of John Philip Kemble, 1799

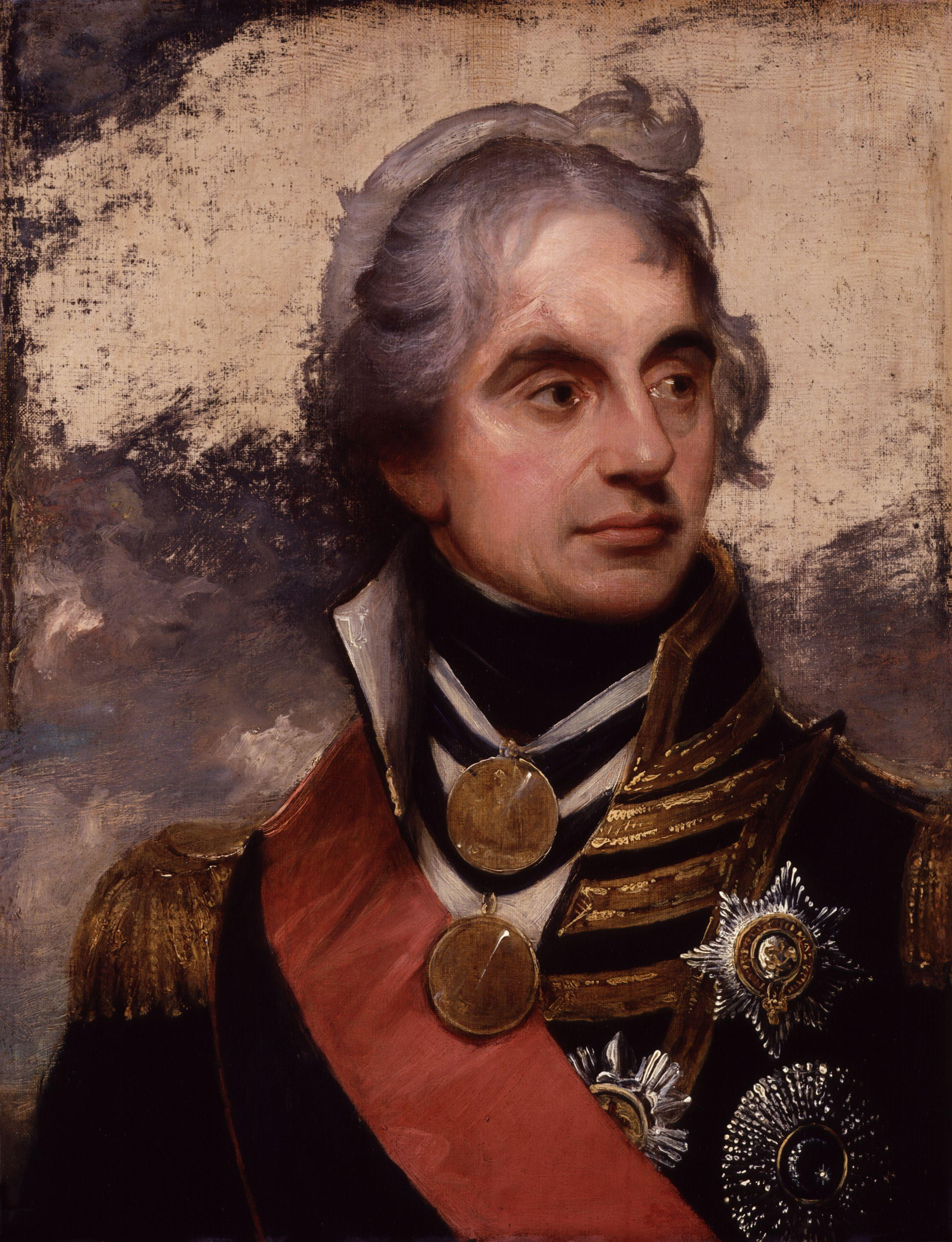
Sketch for portrait of Horatio, 1800

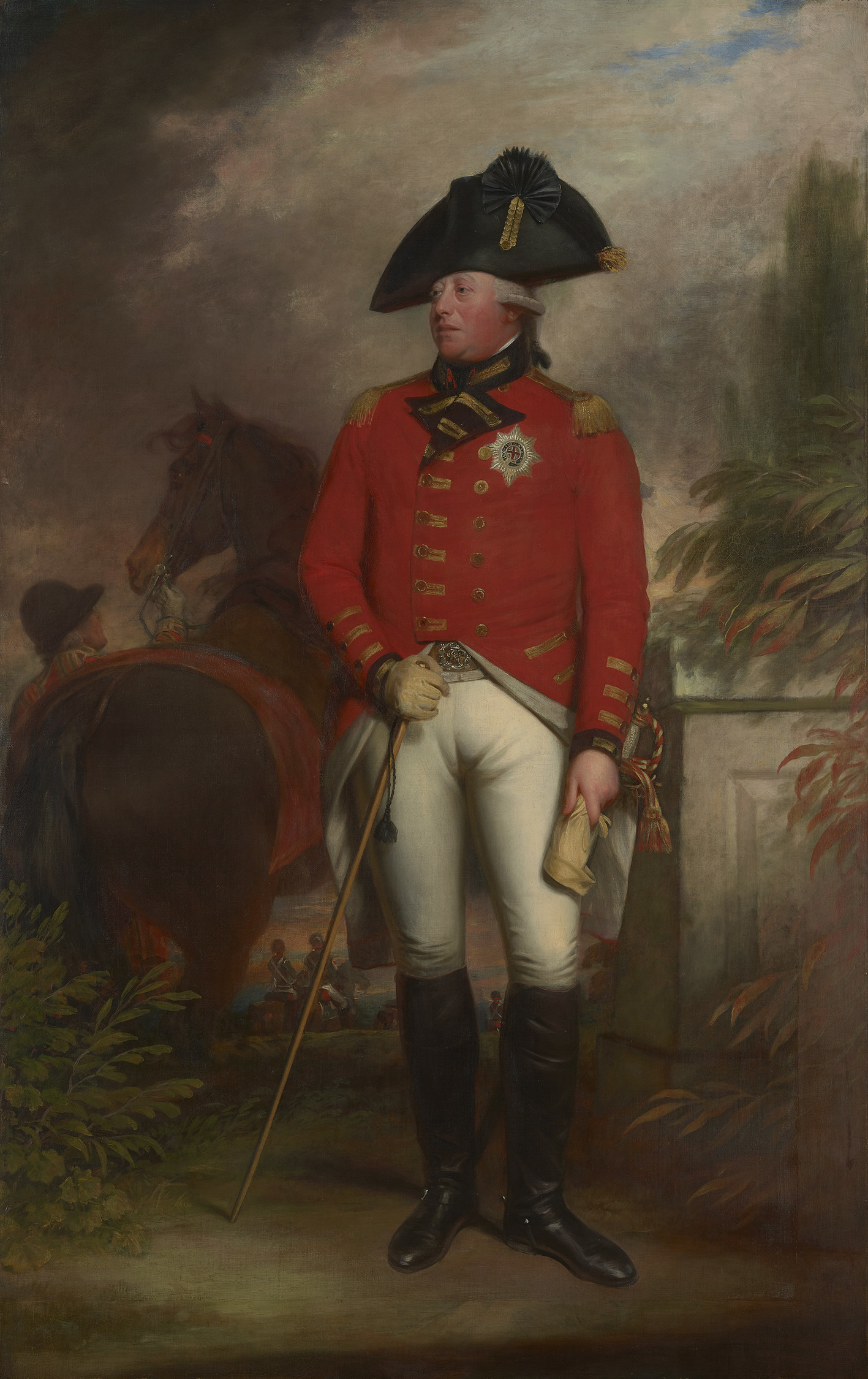
Portrait of George III, 1800

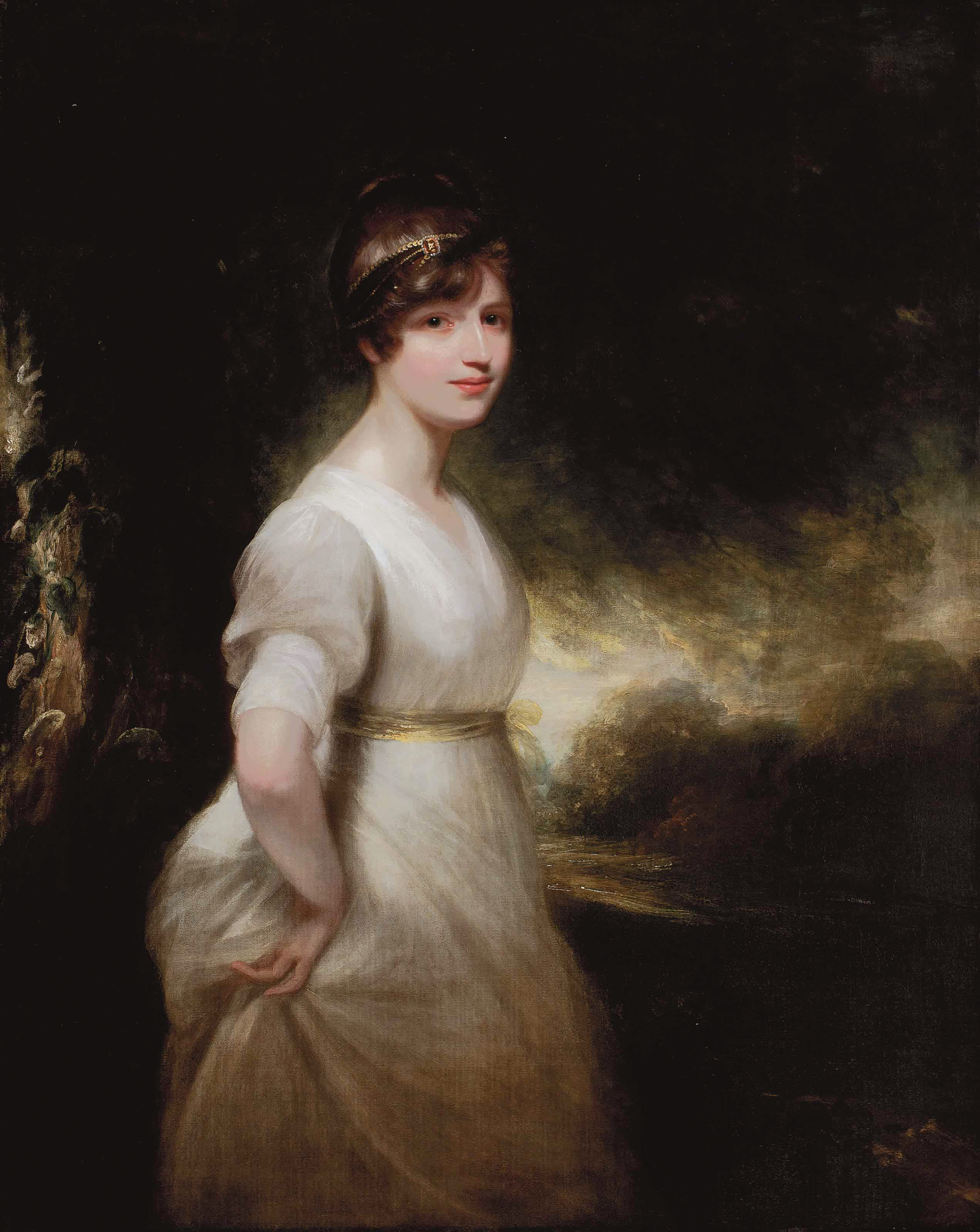
Elizabeth Eden, Lady Godolphin (1780–1847), c. 1800

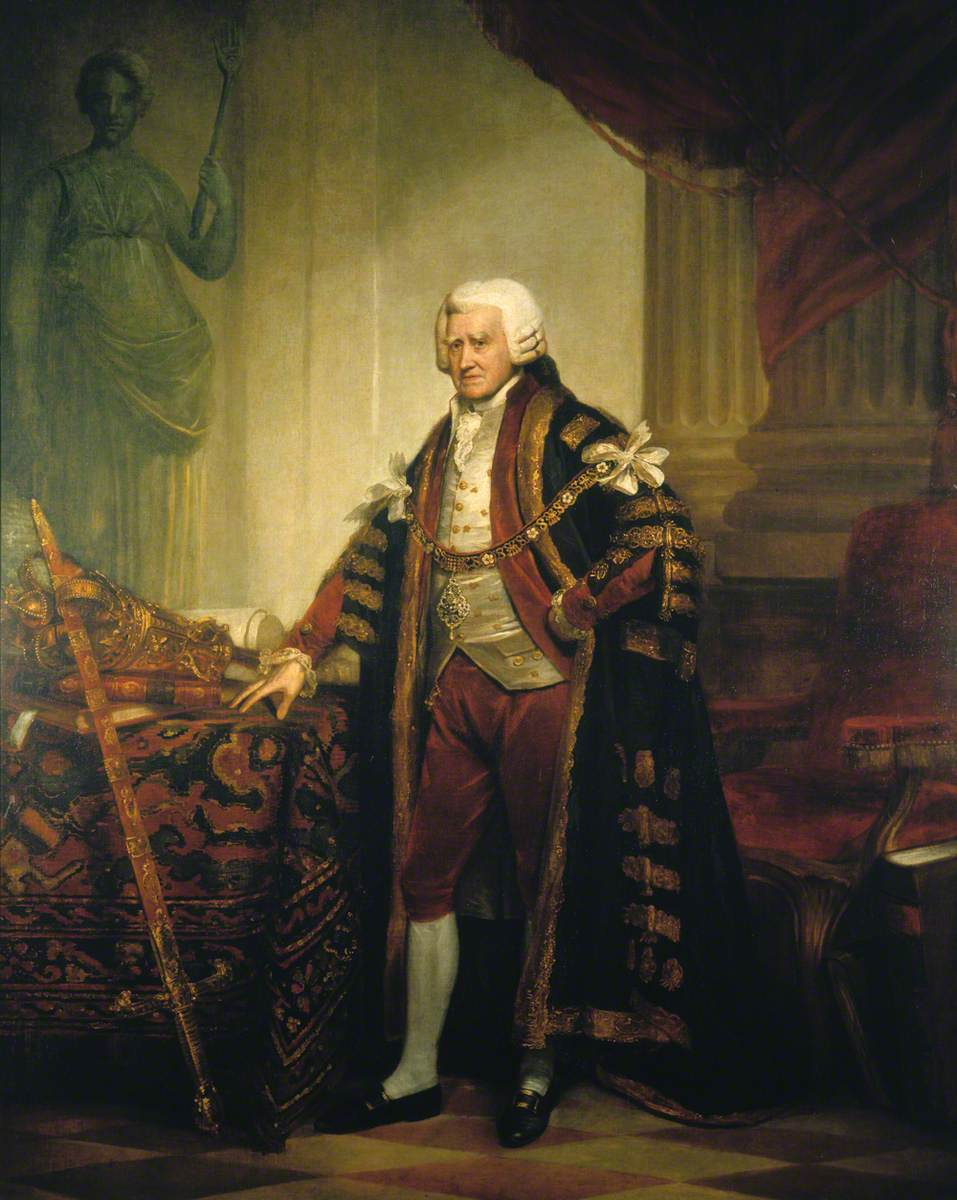
Portrait of John Boydell, 1801

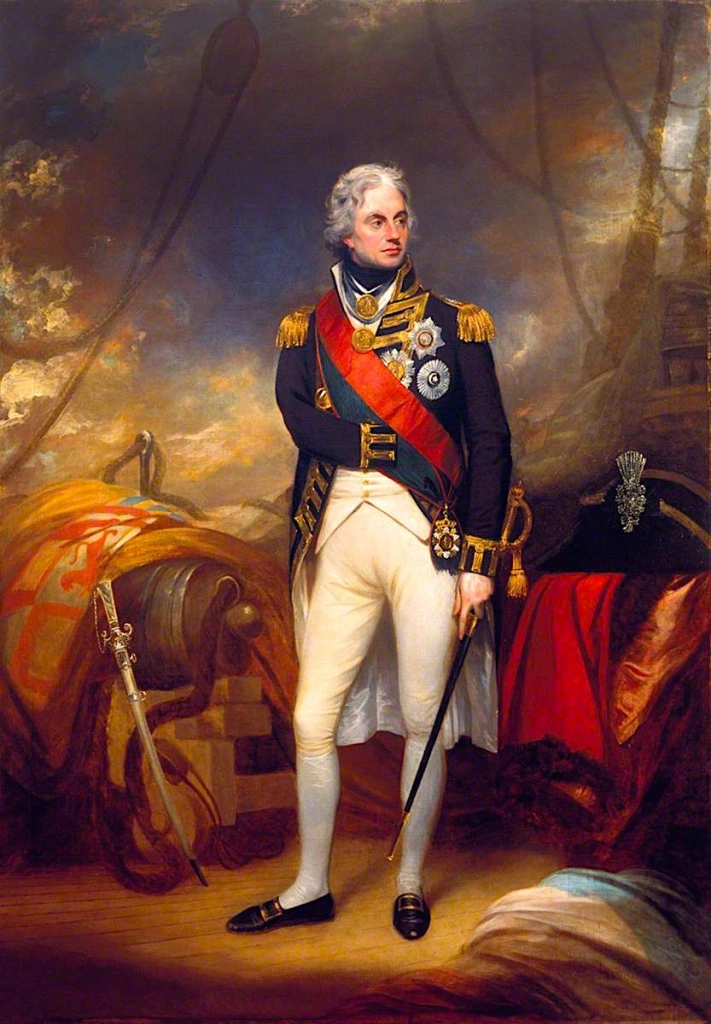
Portrait of Horatio Nelson, 1801

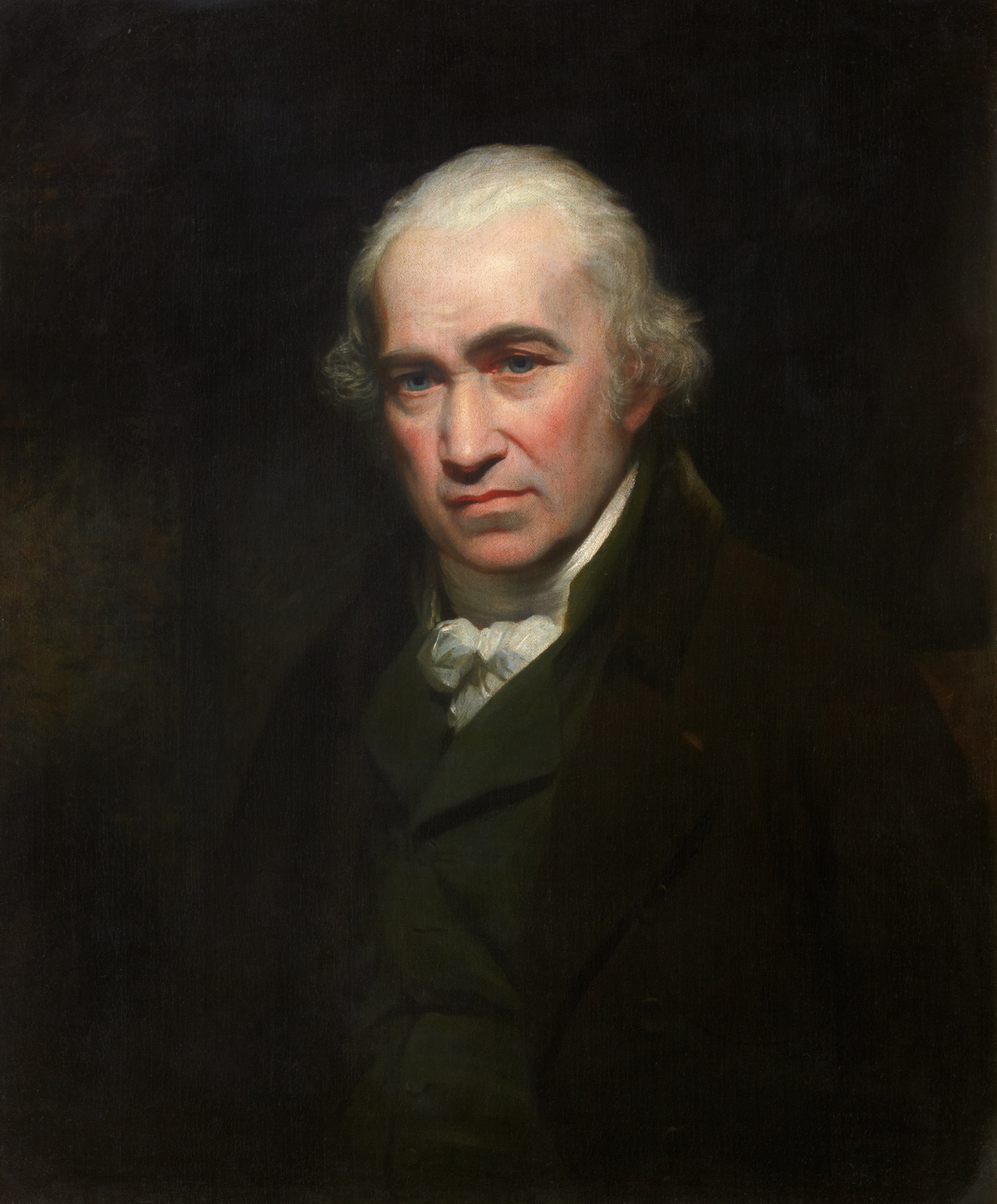
James Watt (1736–1819), c. 1802

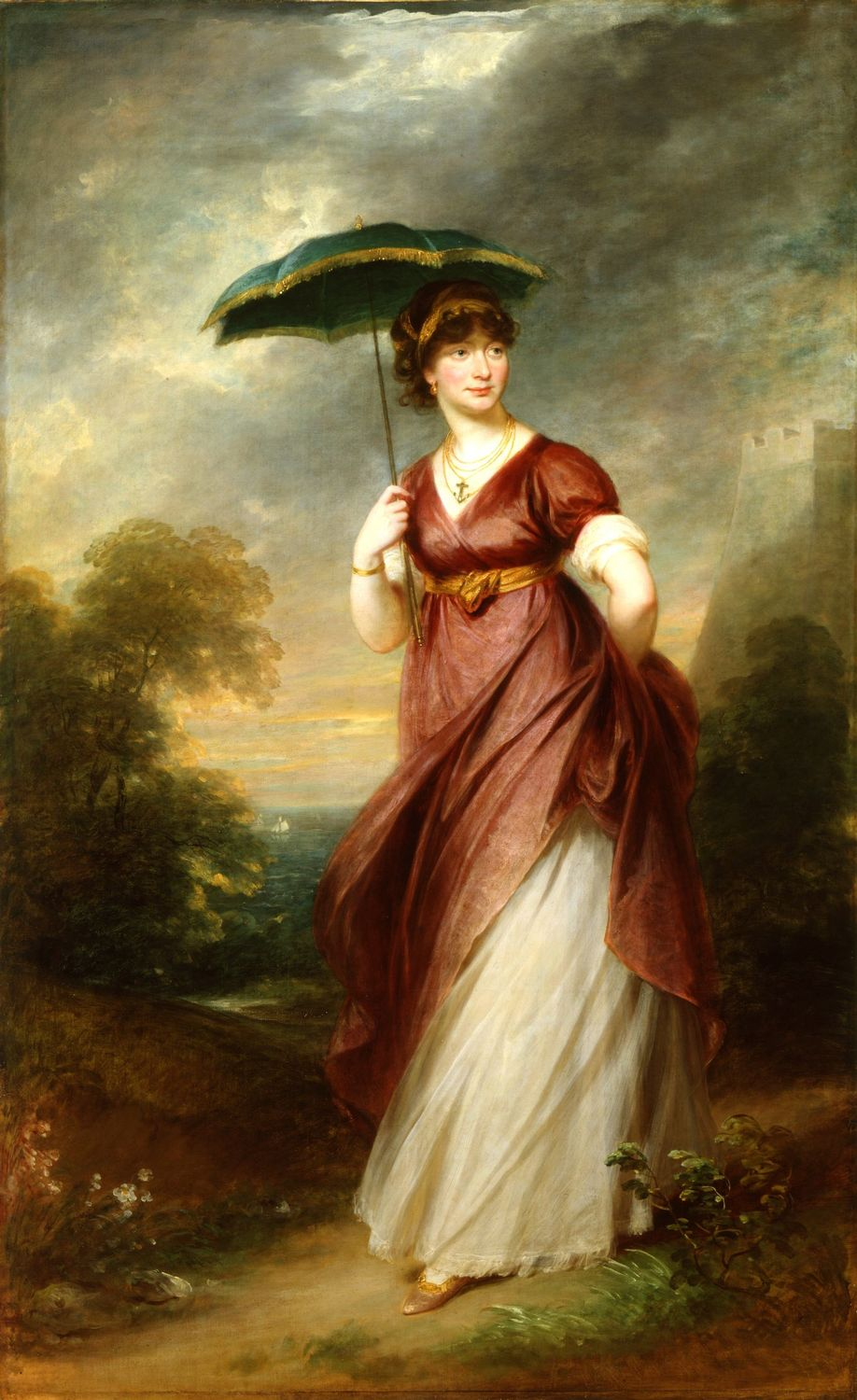
Princess Augusta Sophia, c. 1802

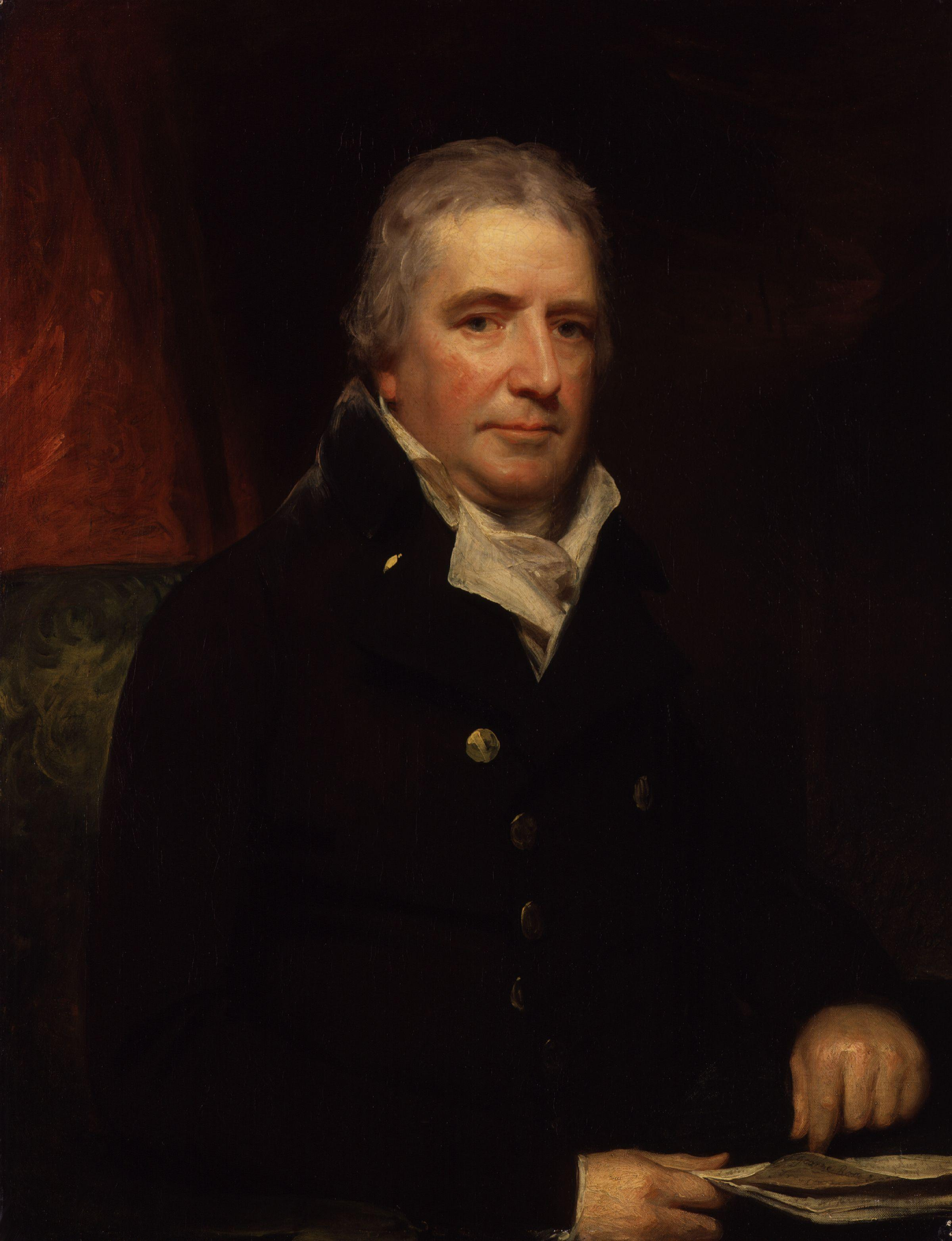
George Rose, 1802

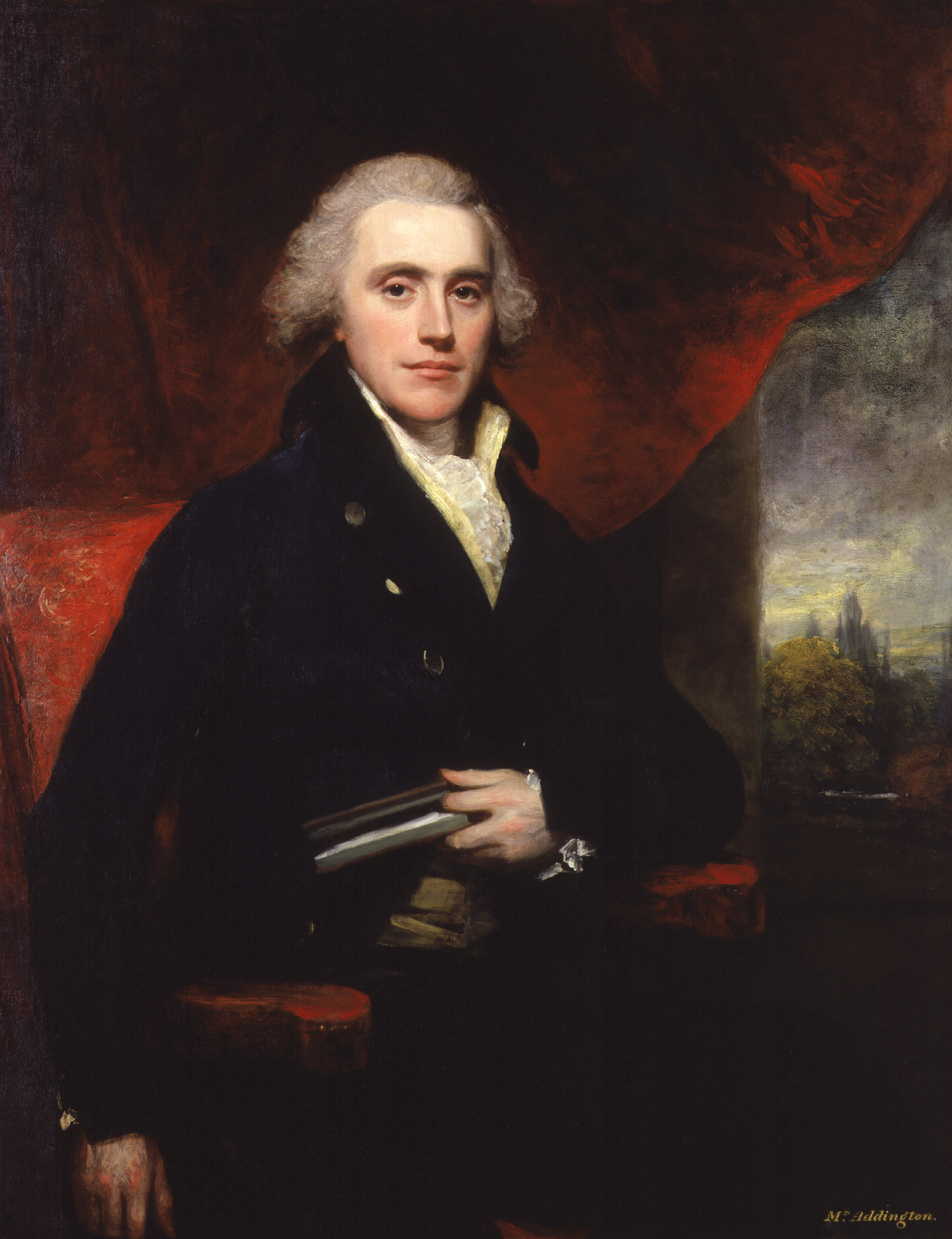
Portrait of Henry Addington, 1803

Mrs Symonds and Her Children, 1803

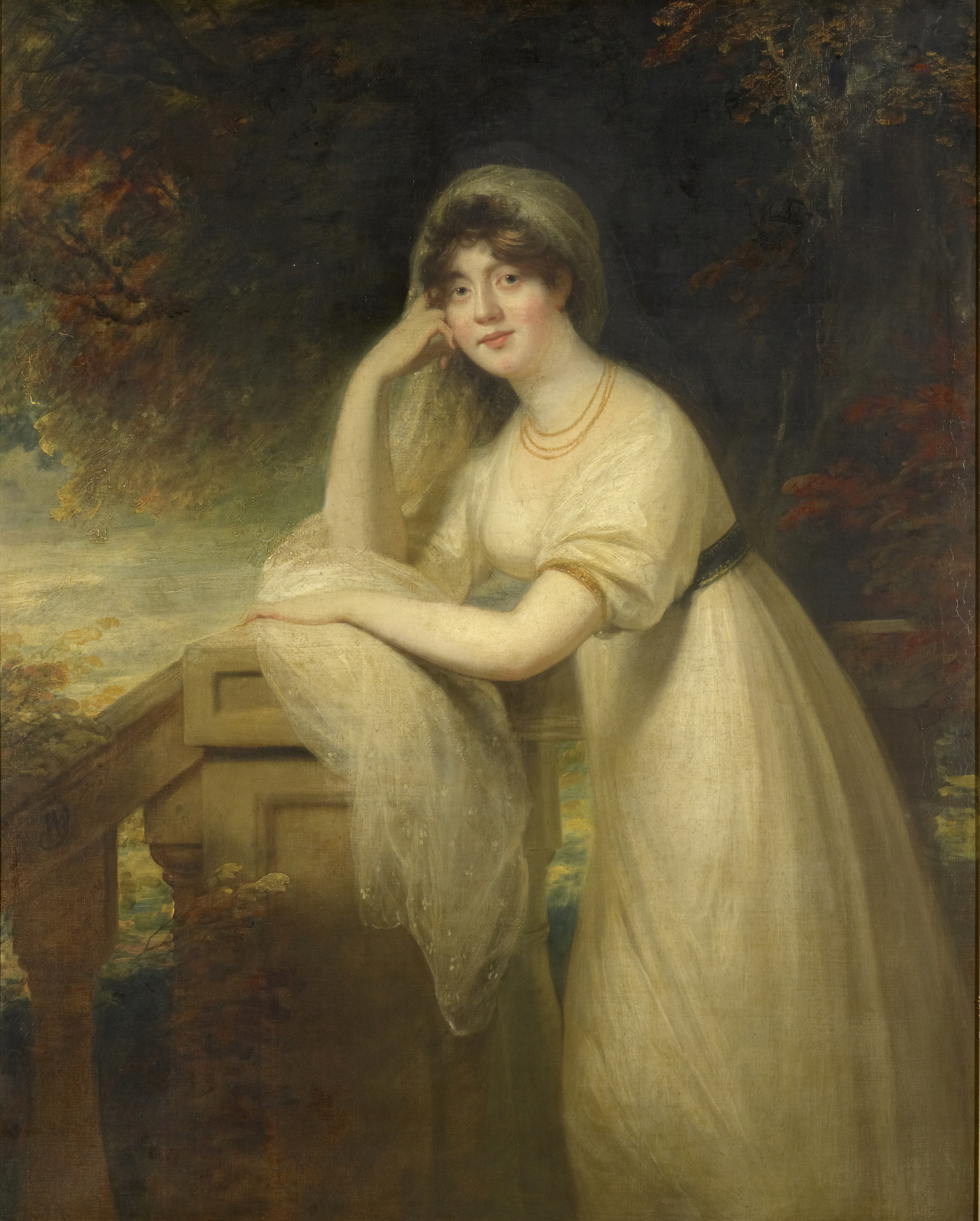
Princess Sophia of Gloucester, c.1803

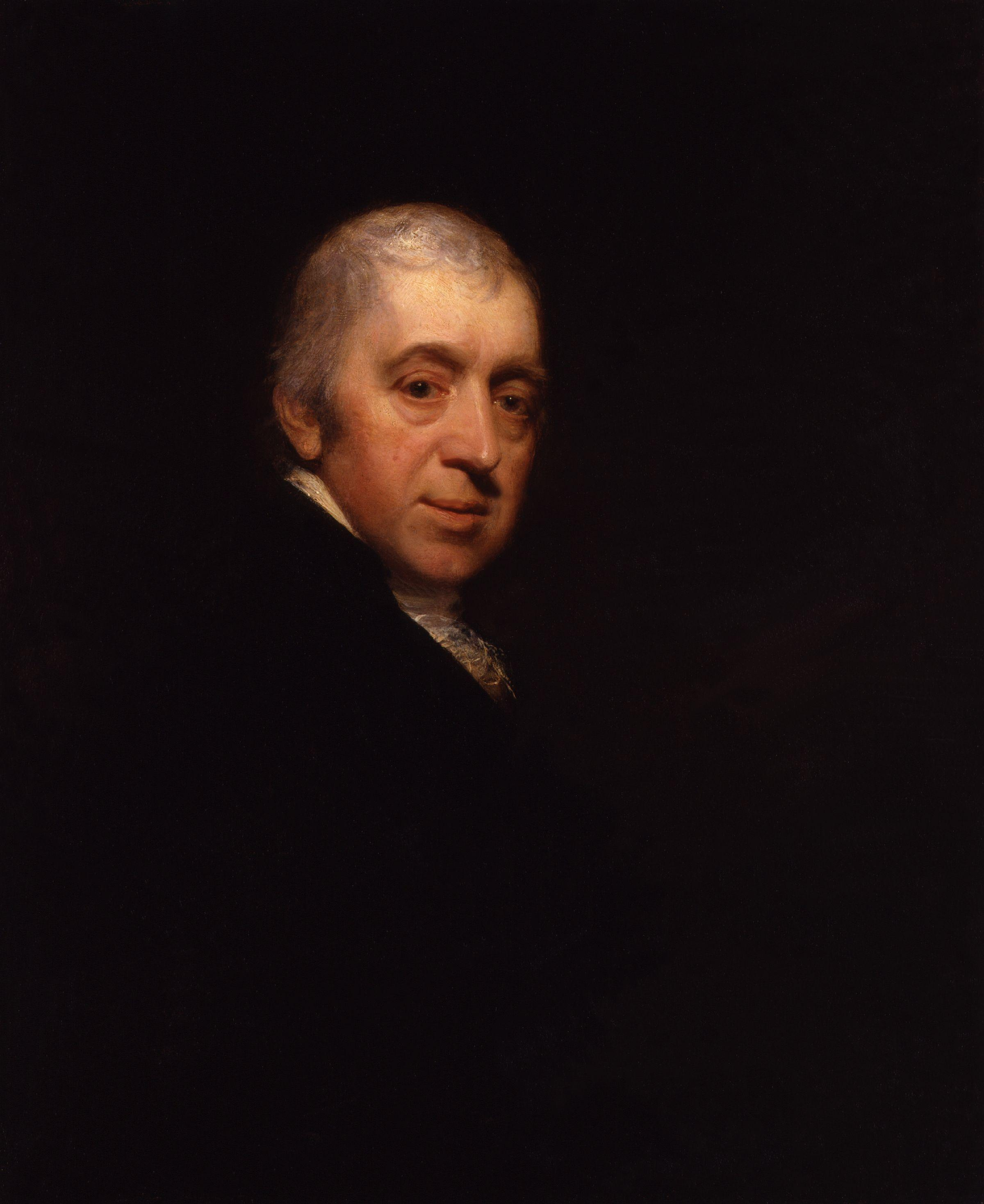
Lord Mulgrave, 1807

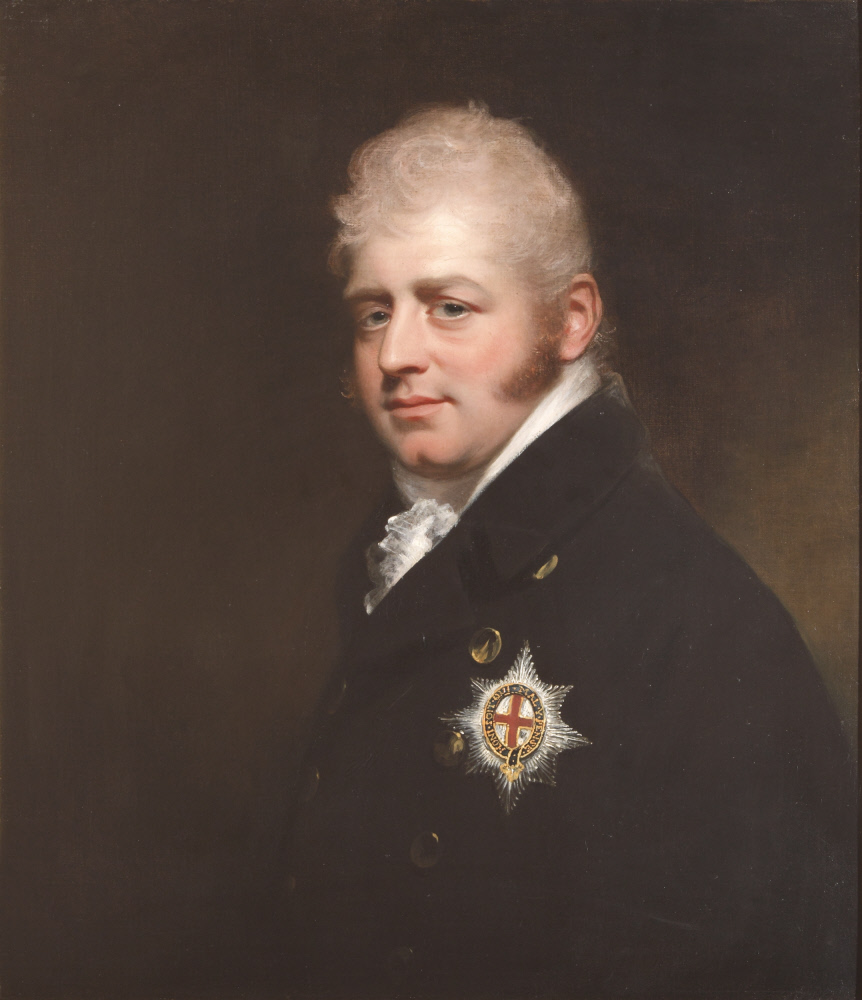
Adolphus, Duke of Cambridge, 1808

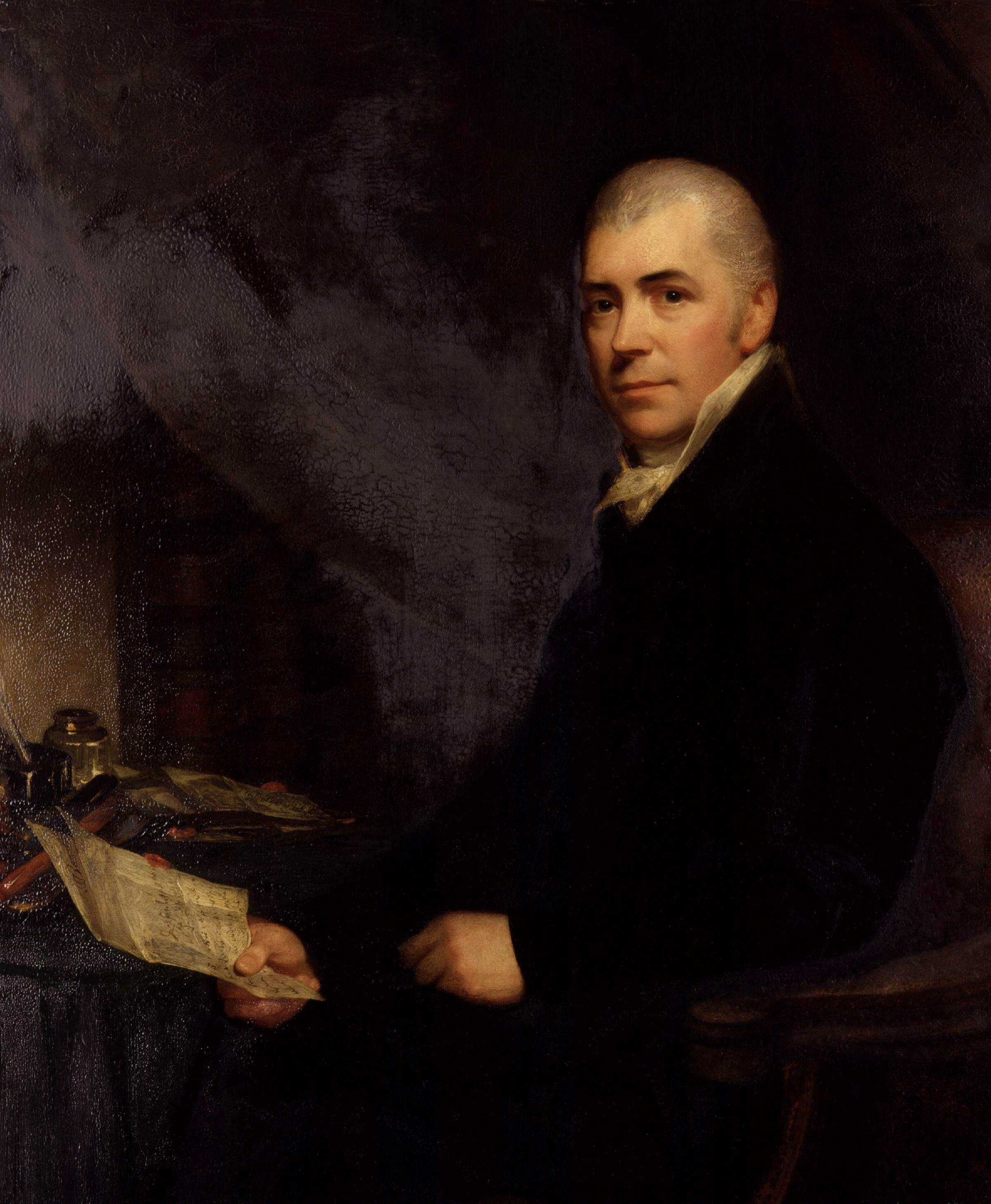
Henry Halford, 1809

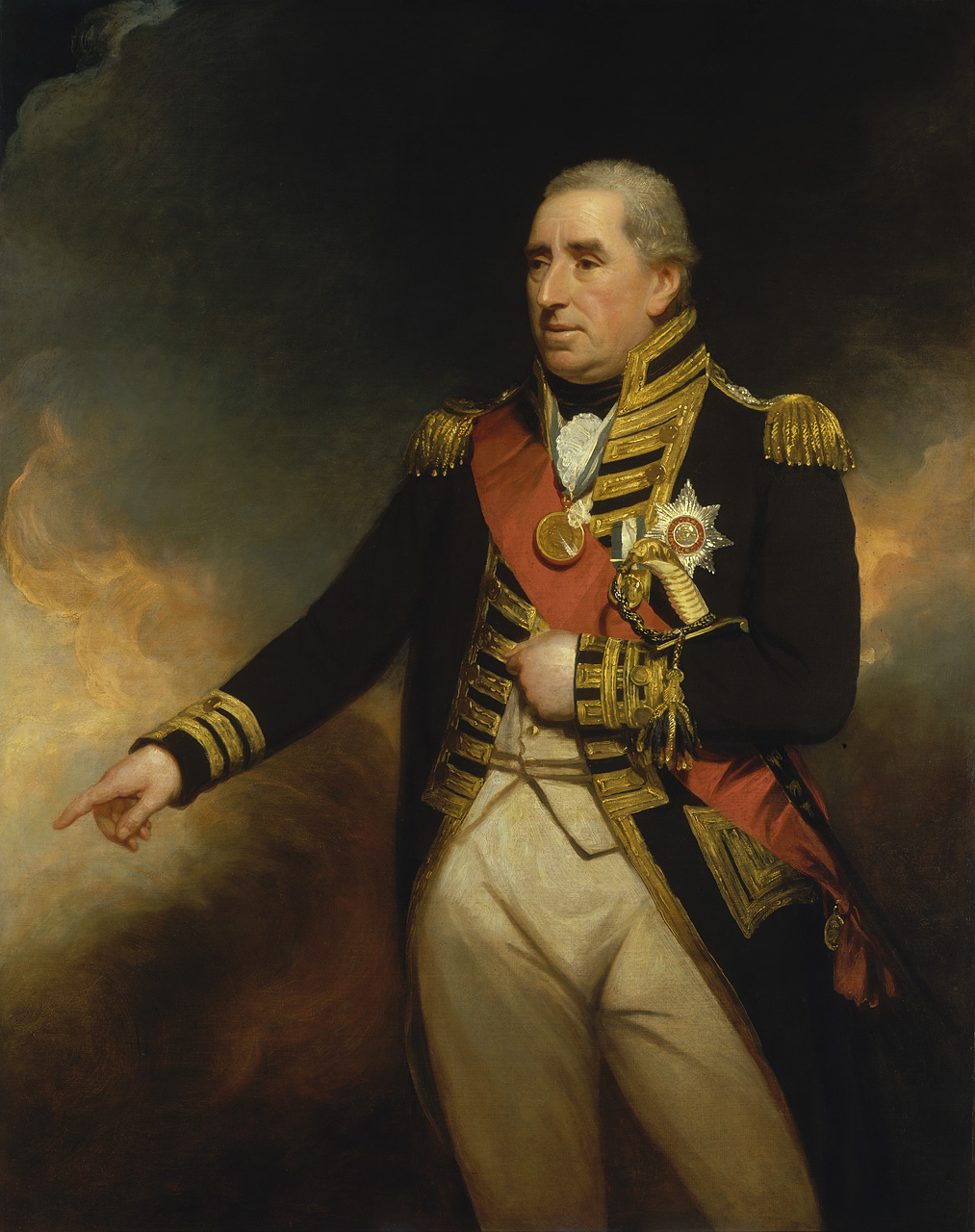
John Duckworth, 1809

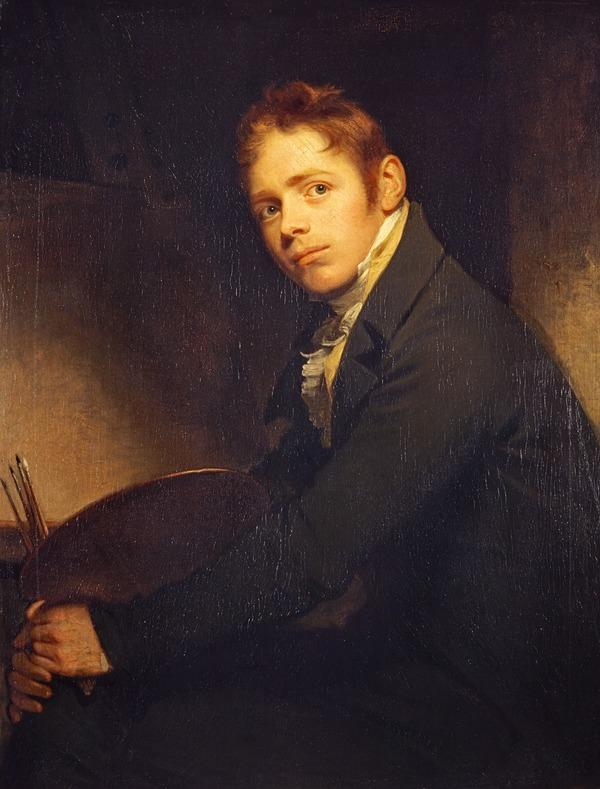
David Wilkie, c.1809

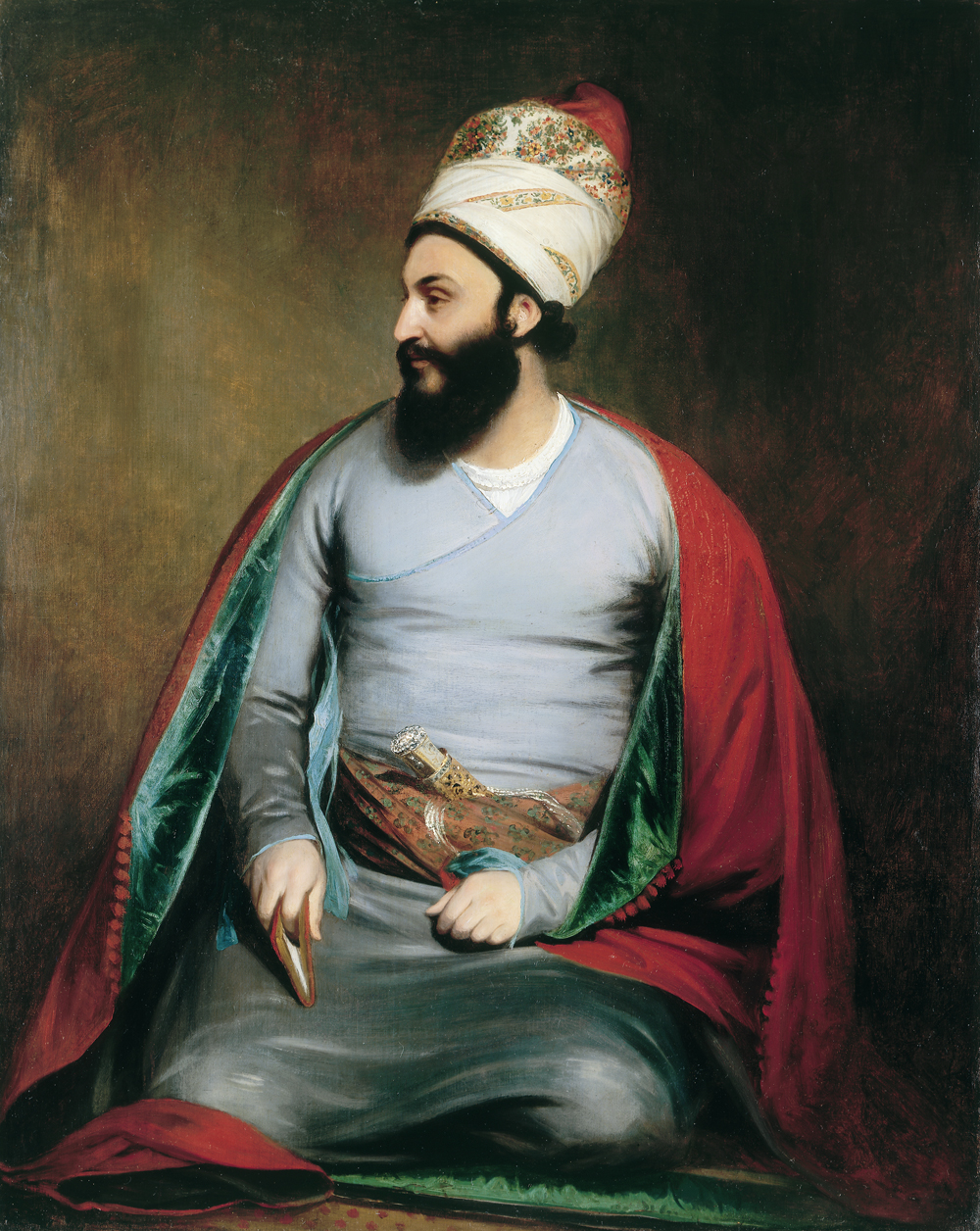
Mirza Abu'l Hassan Khan, 1809–10

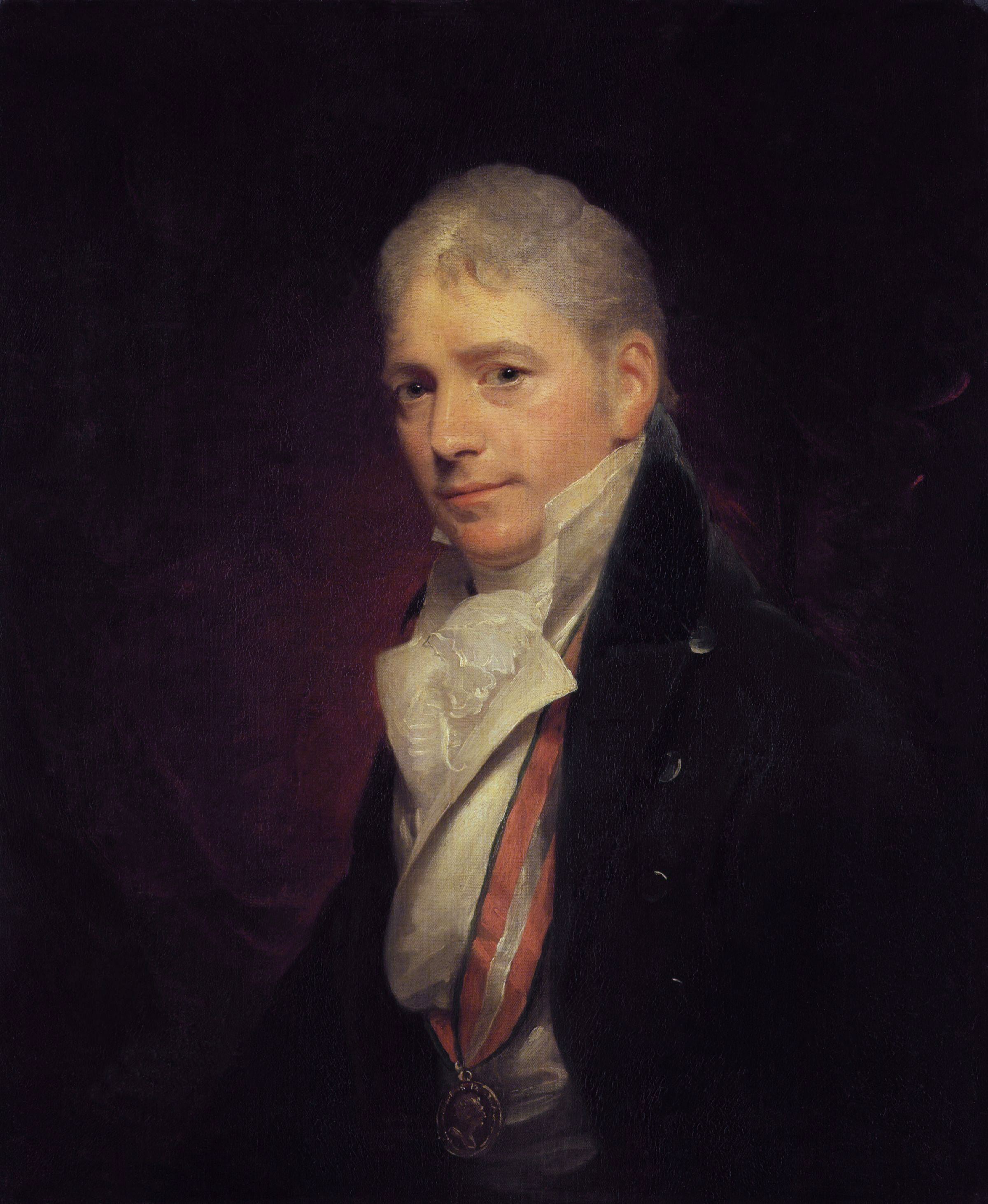
Portrait of Francis Bourgeois, 1810

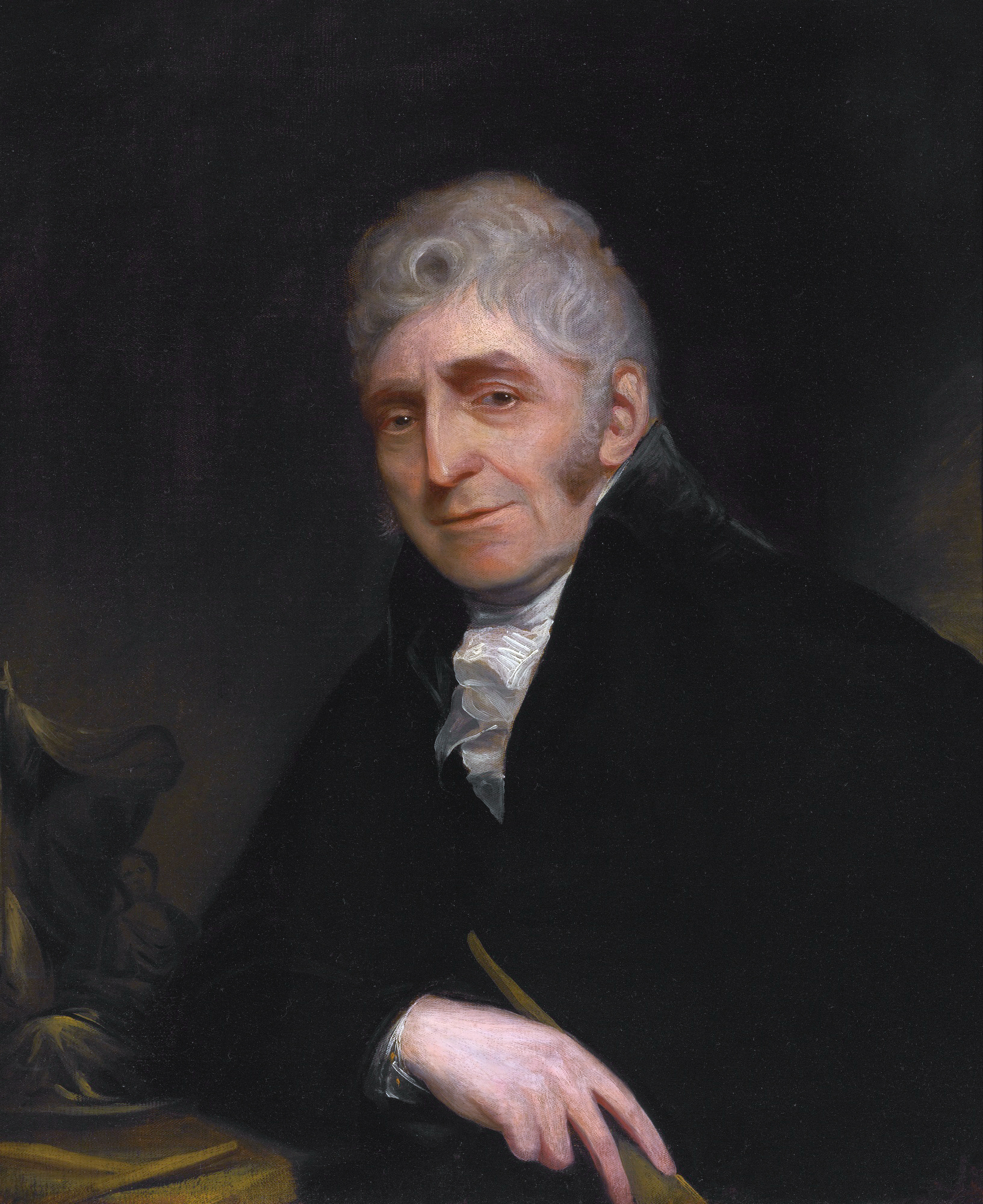
Portrait of Joseph Nollekens, 1812

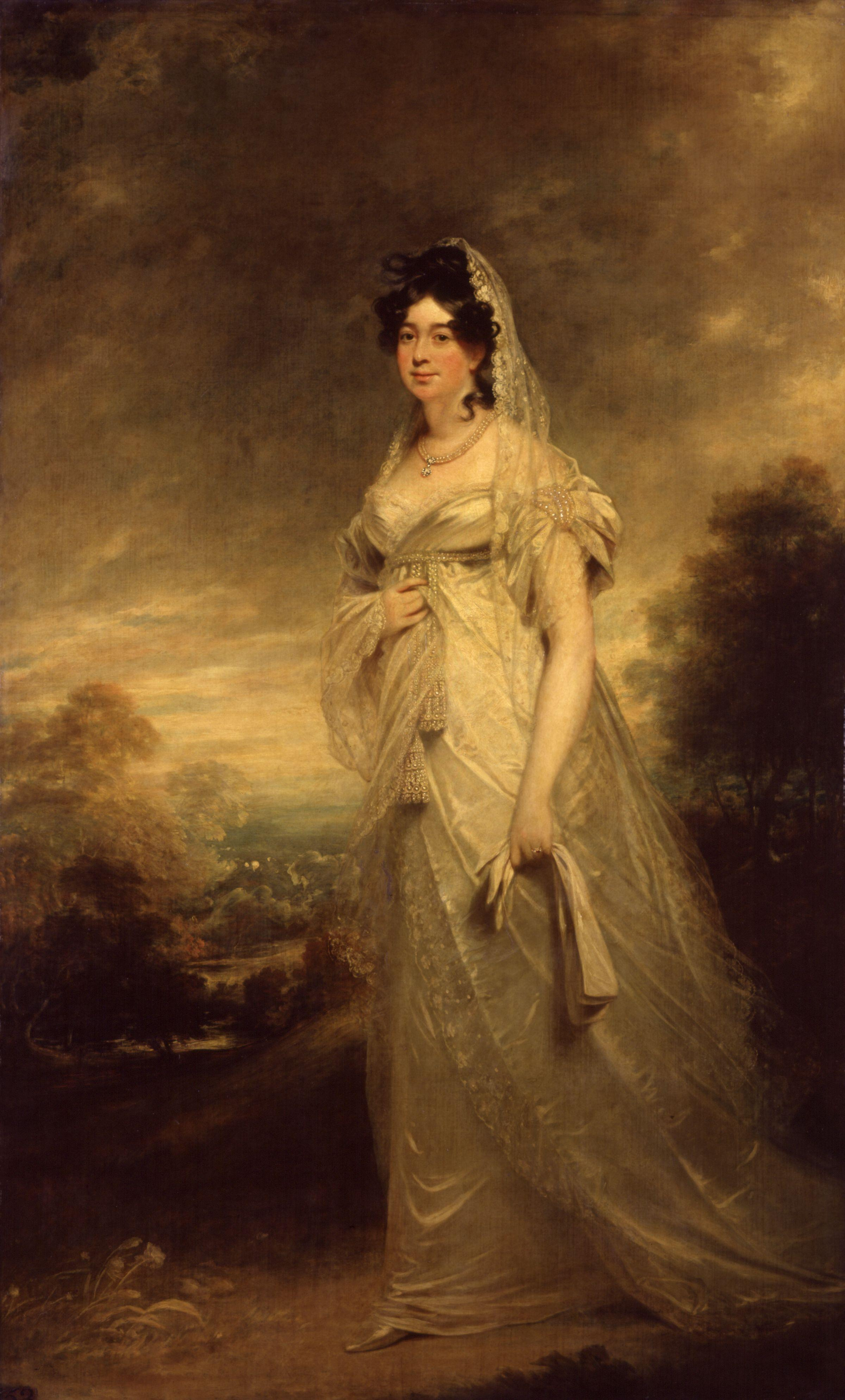
Portrait of Harriet Mellon, 1815

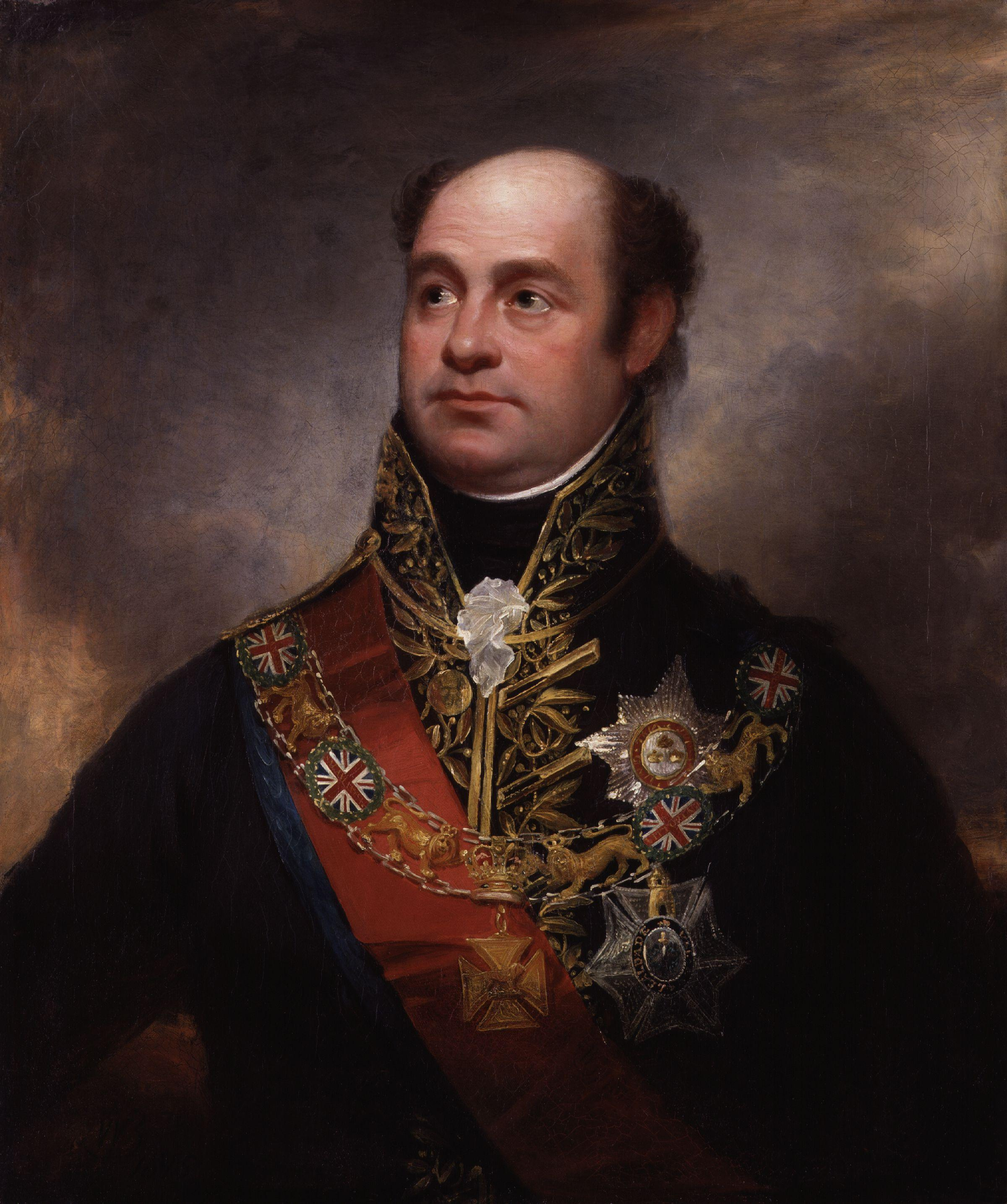
Portrait of Lord Beresford, c. 1815

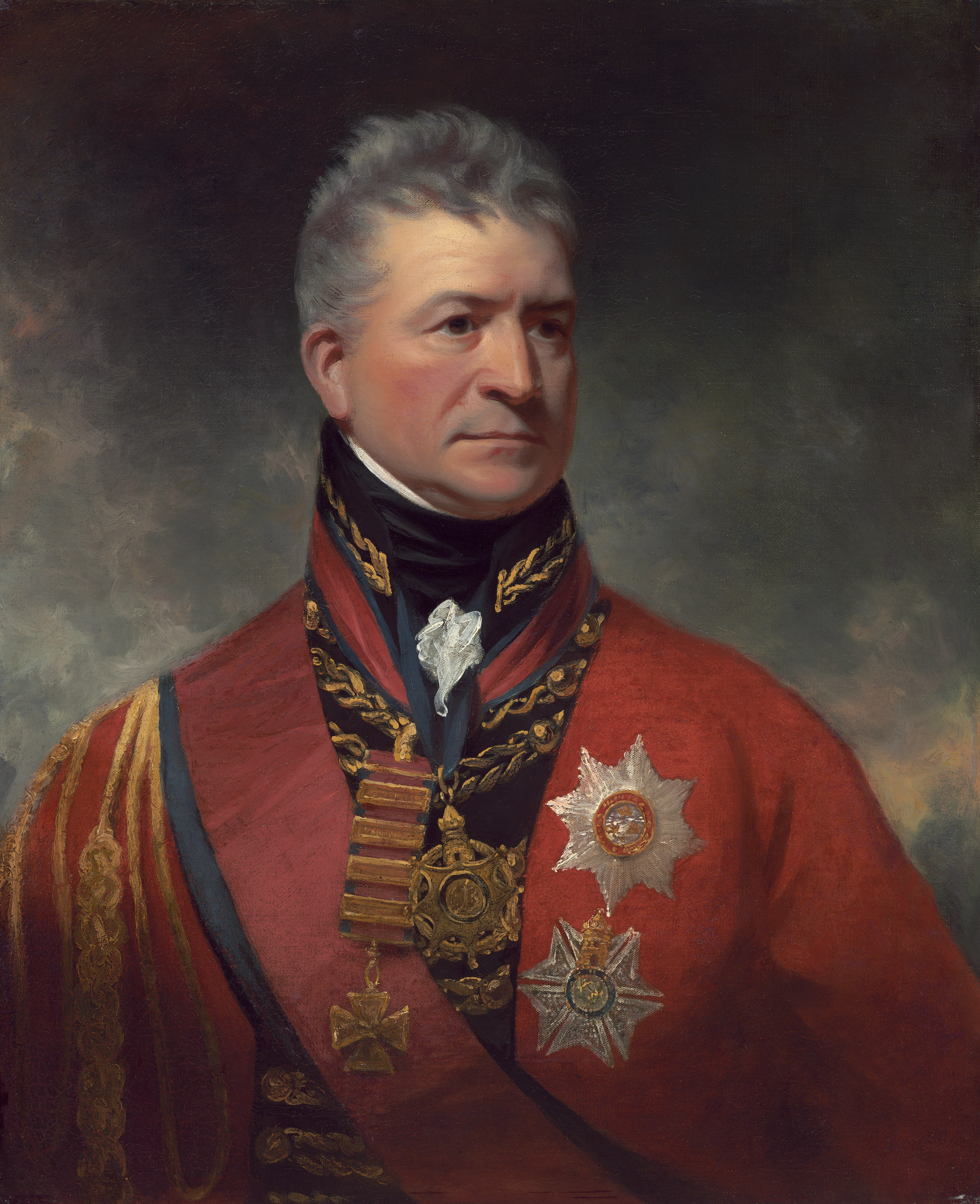
Portrait of Thomas Picton, c. 1815

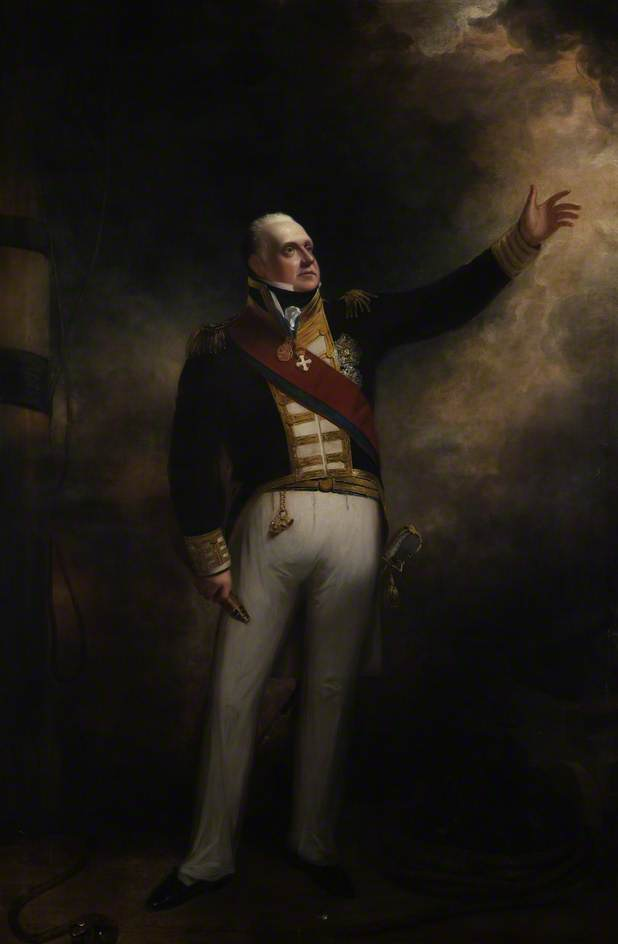
Lord Exmouth During the Bombardment of Algiers, 1817

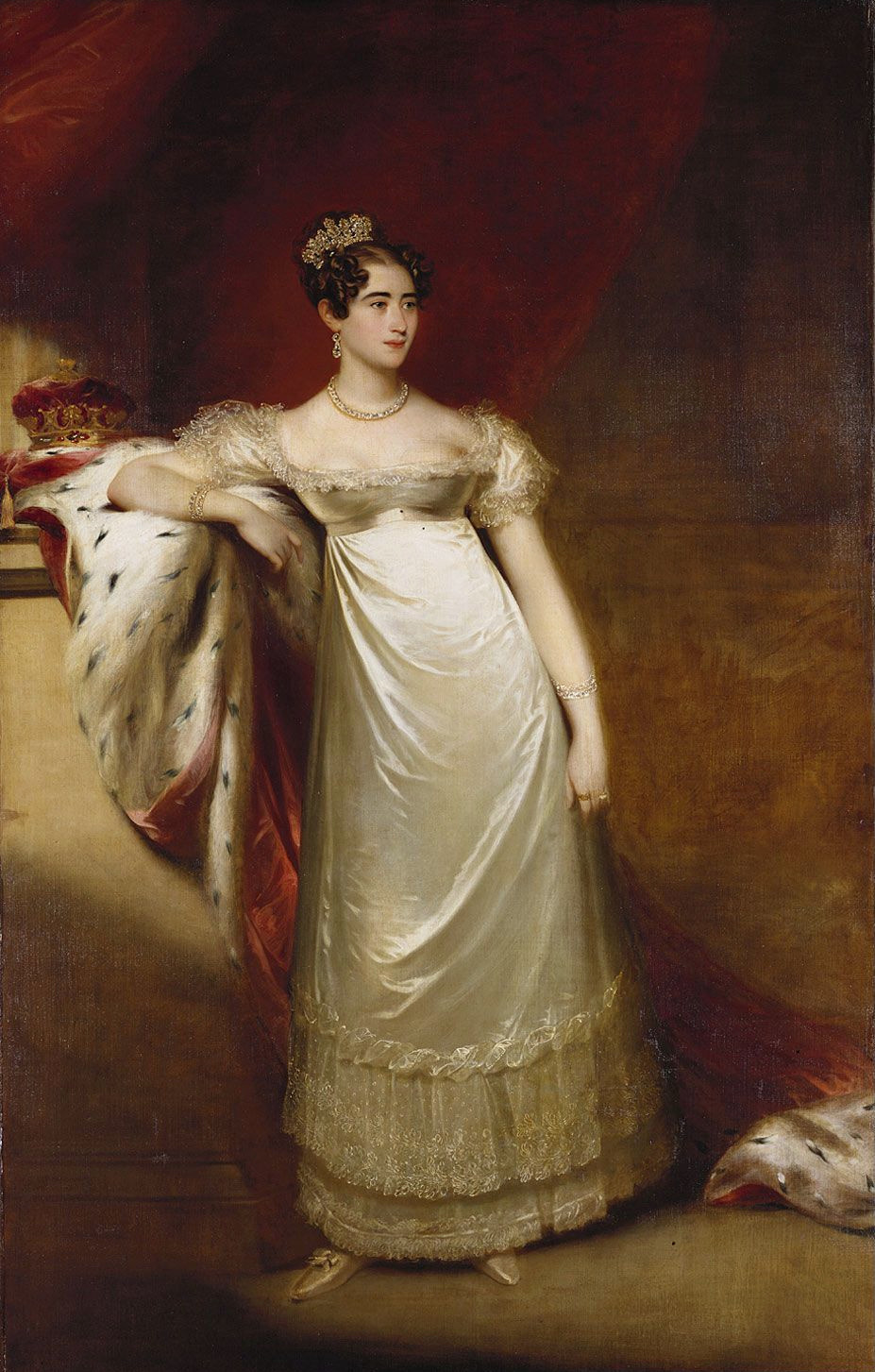
Portrait of Augusta, Duchess of Cambridge, 1818

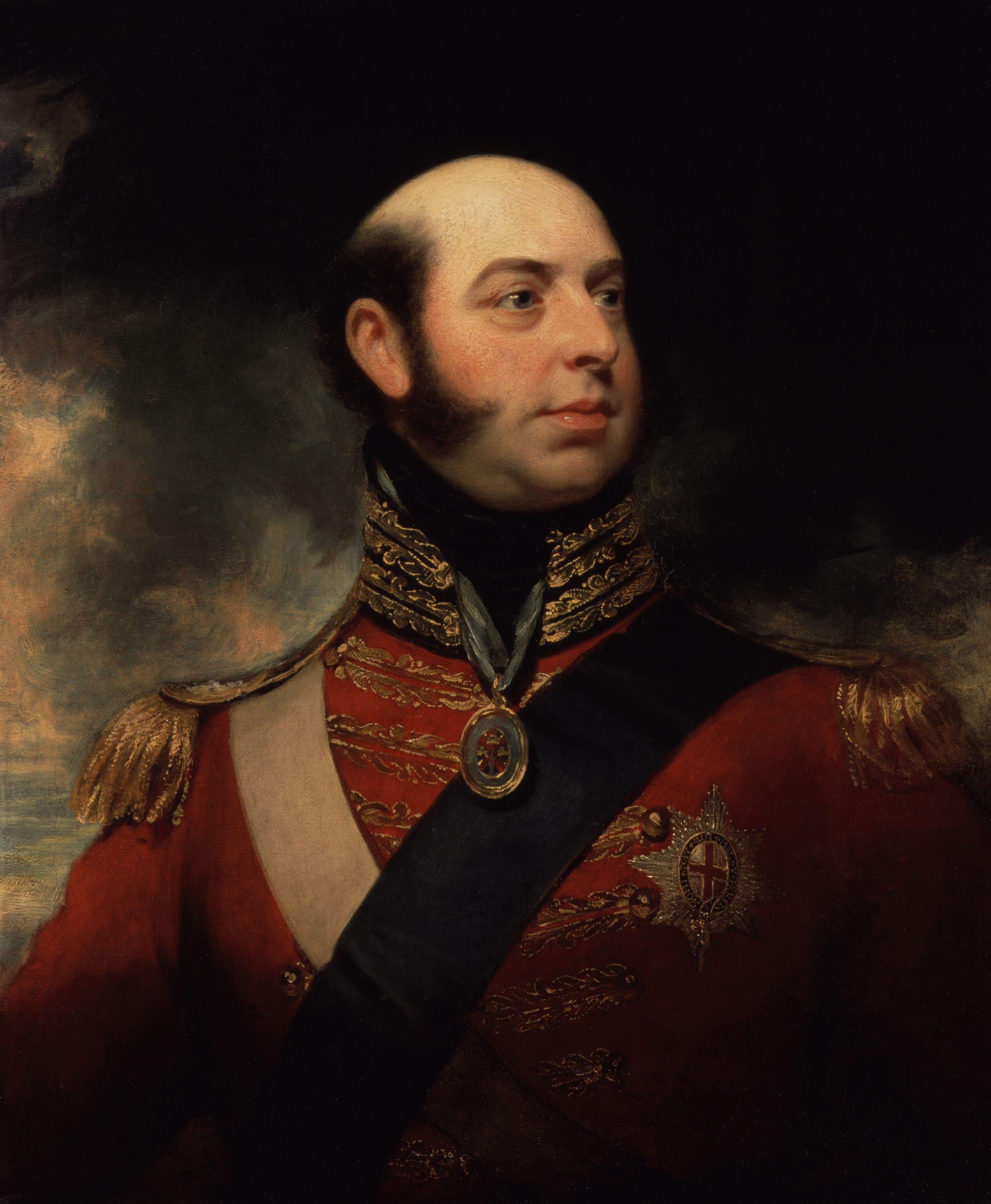
Edward, Duke of Kent, 1818

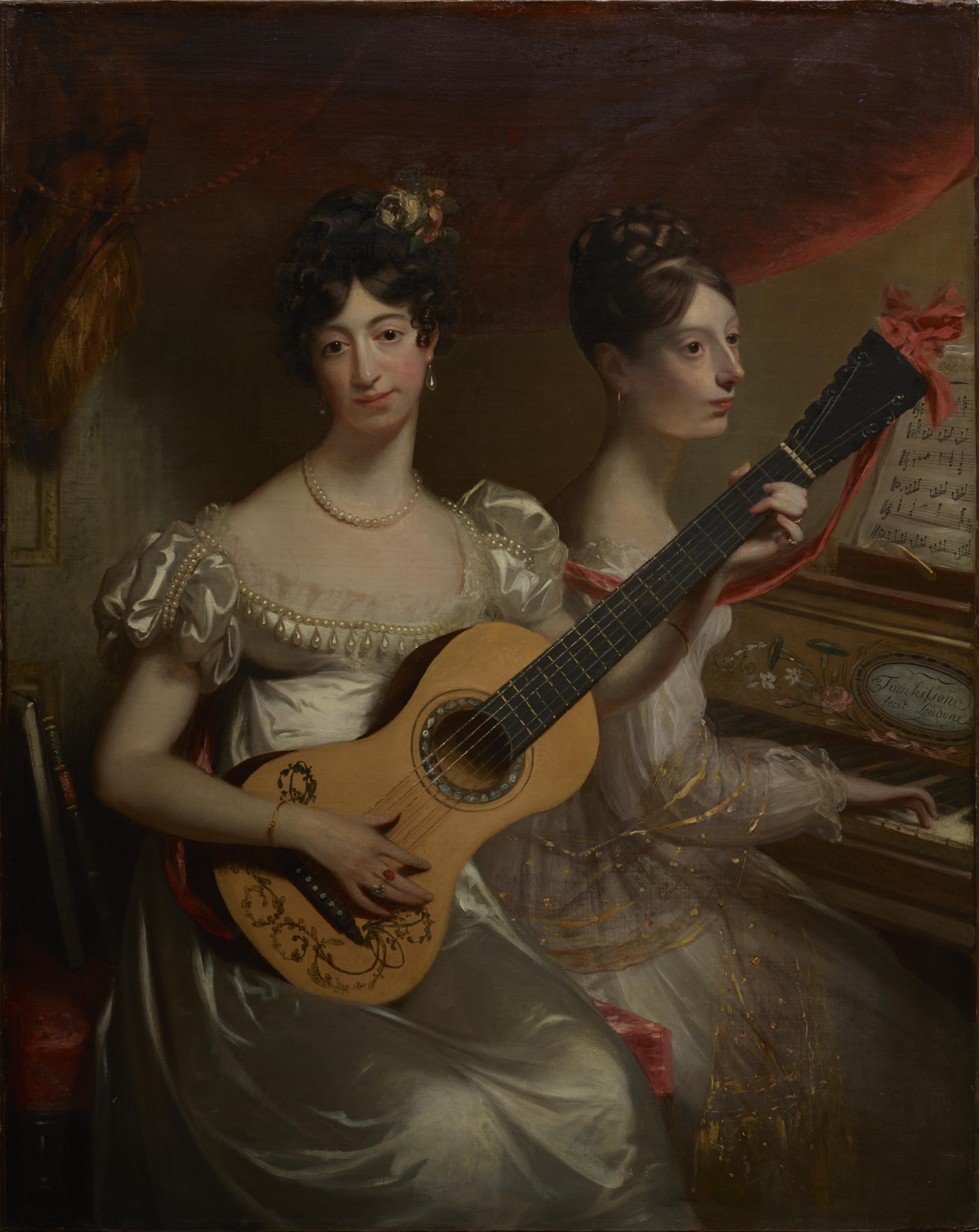
The Misses Plowden, 1819

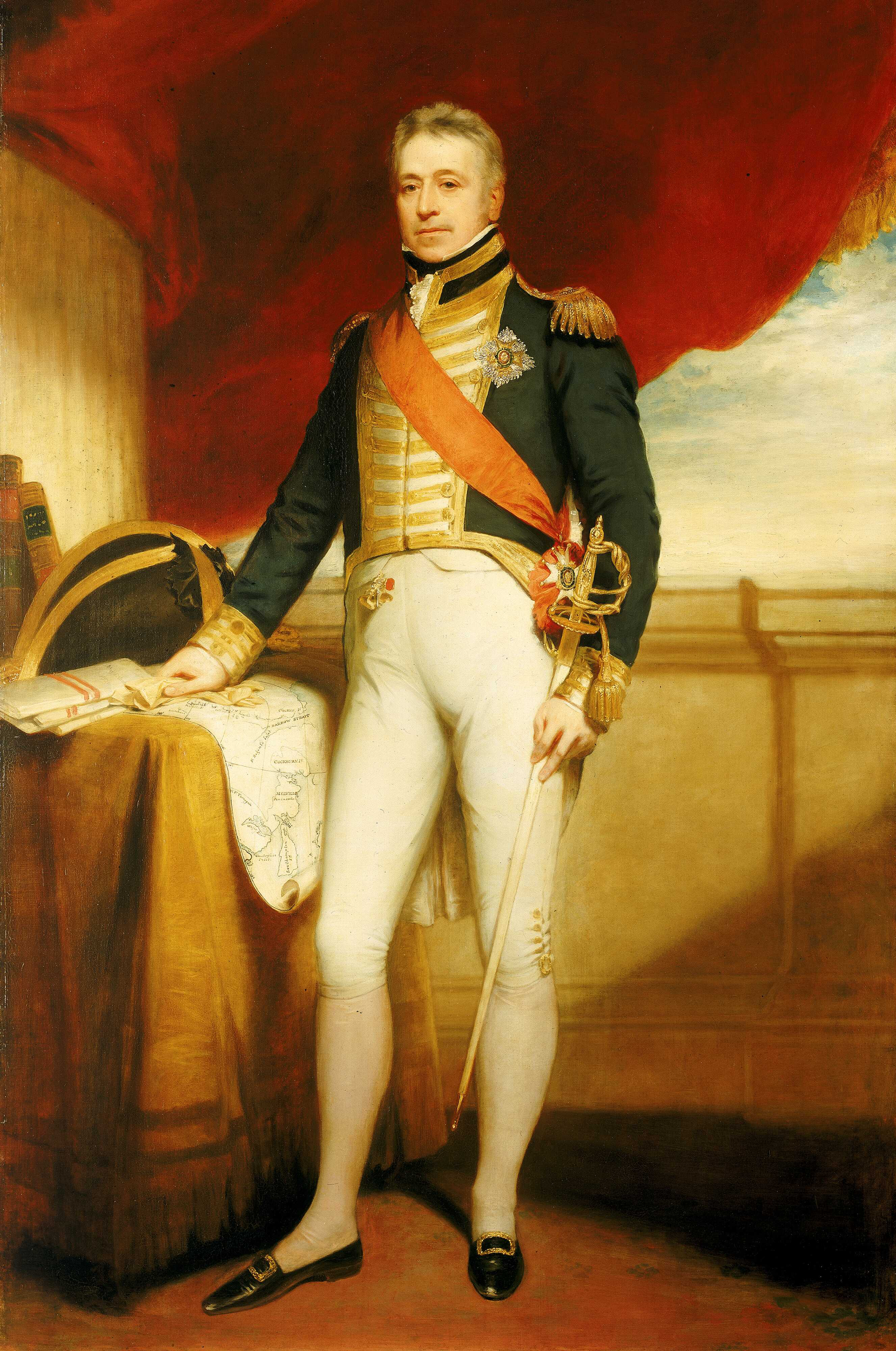
Portrait of George Cockburn, 1820

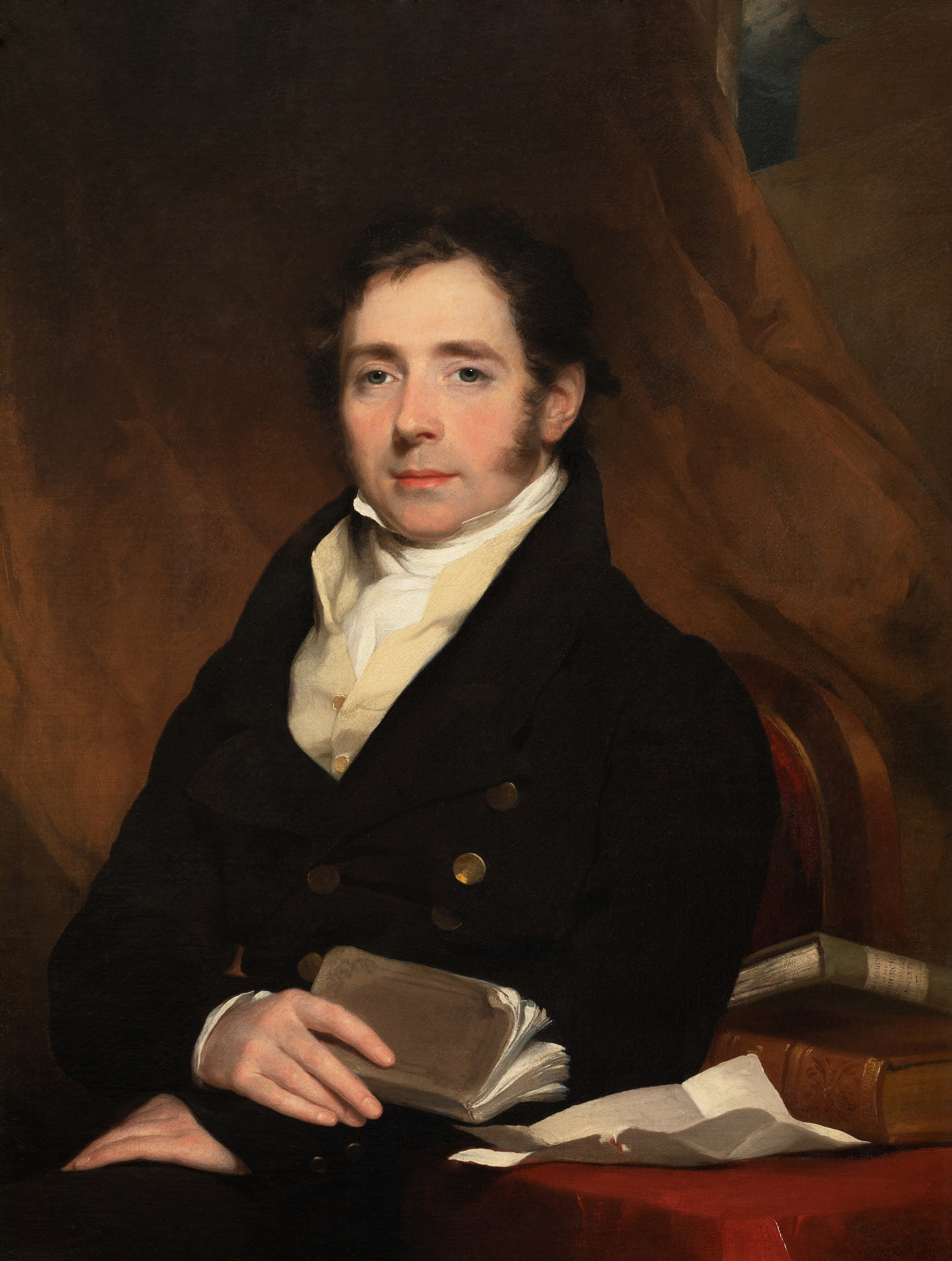
Robert Grant, 1823

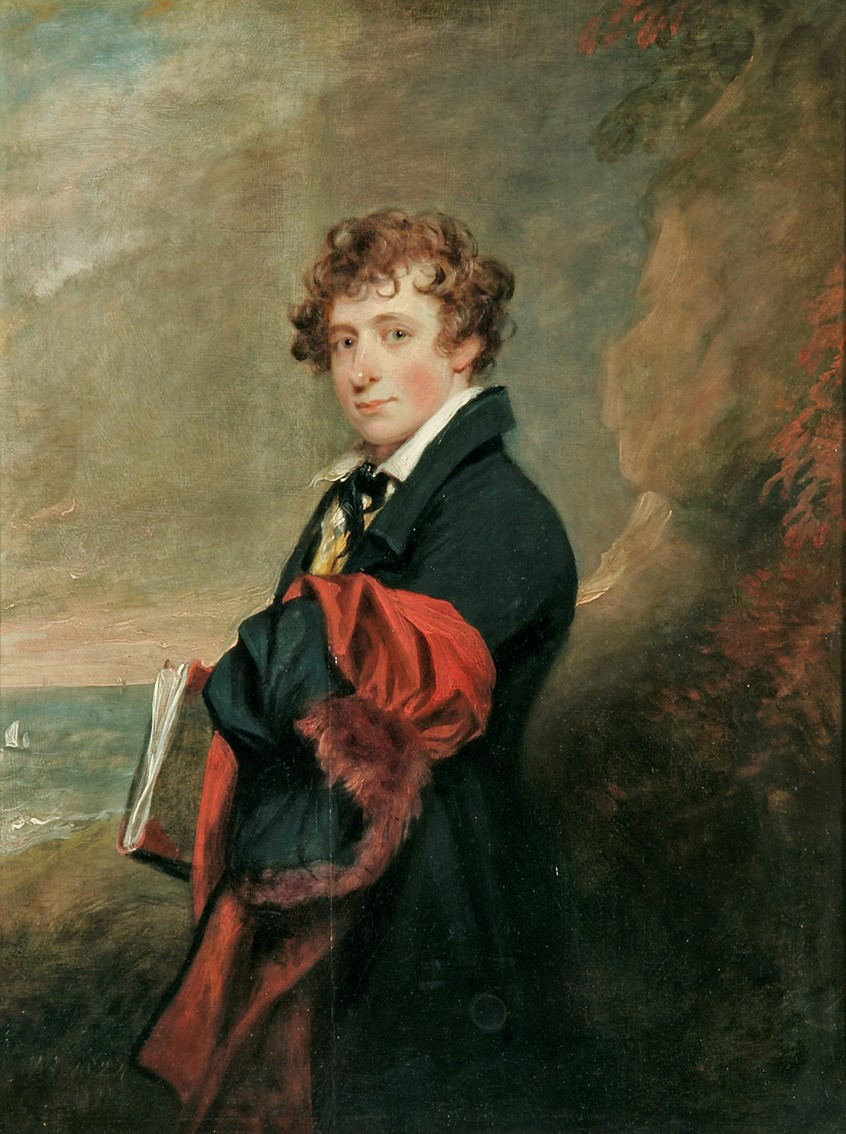
Joseph Stannard, 1824

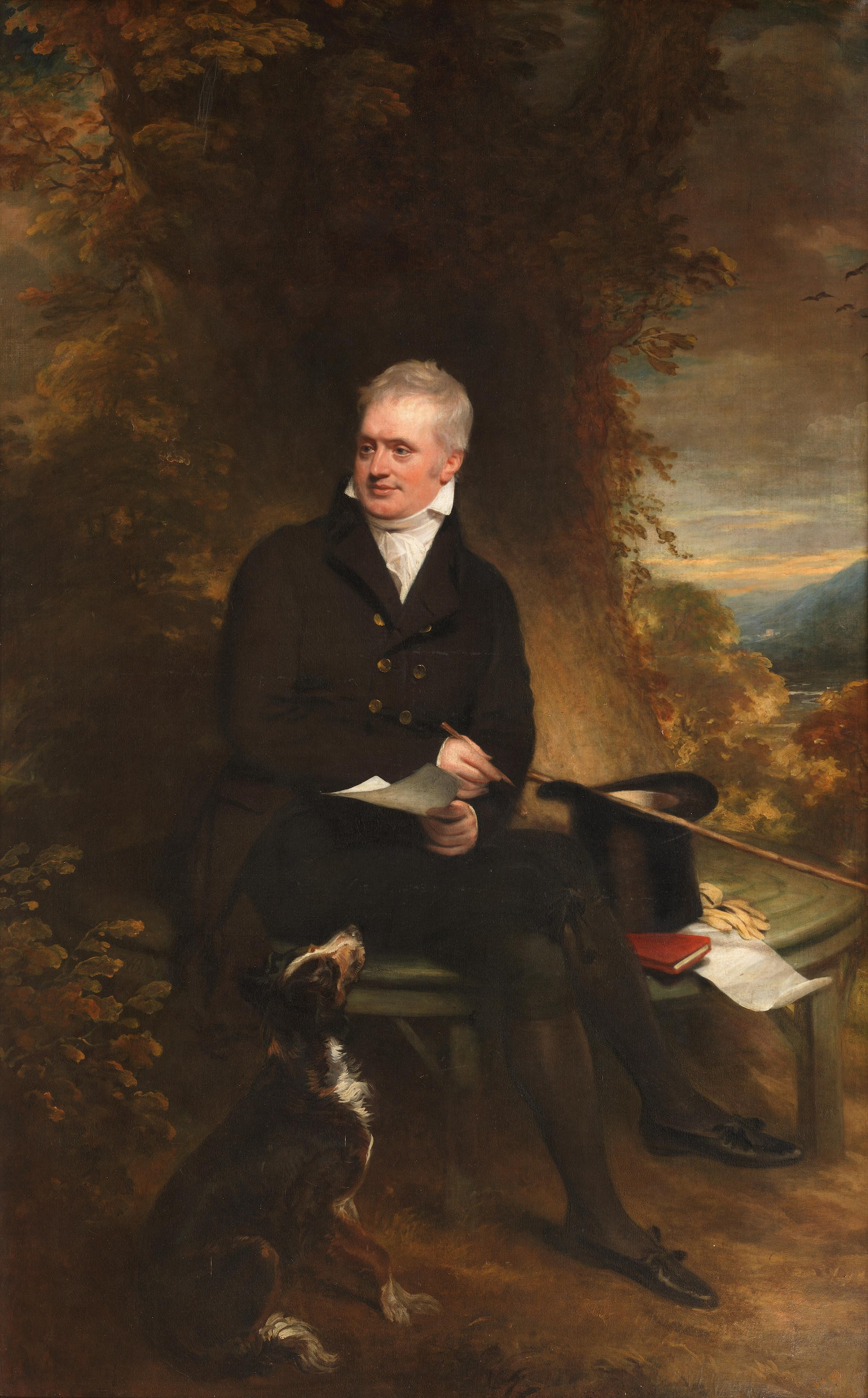
Portrait of Thomas Lowndes, 1824

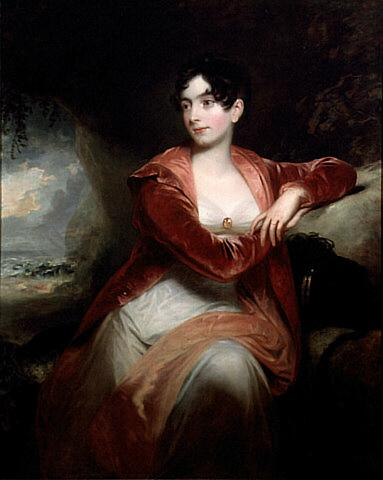
Miss Windham, 1828

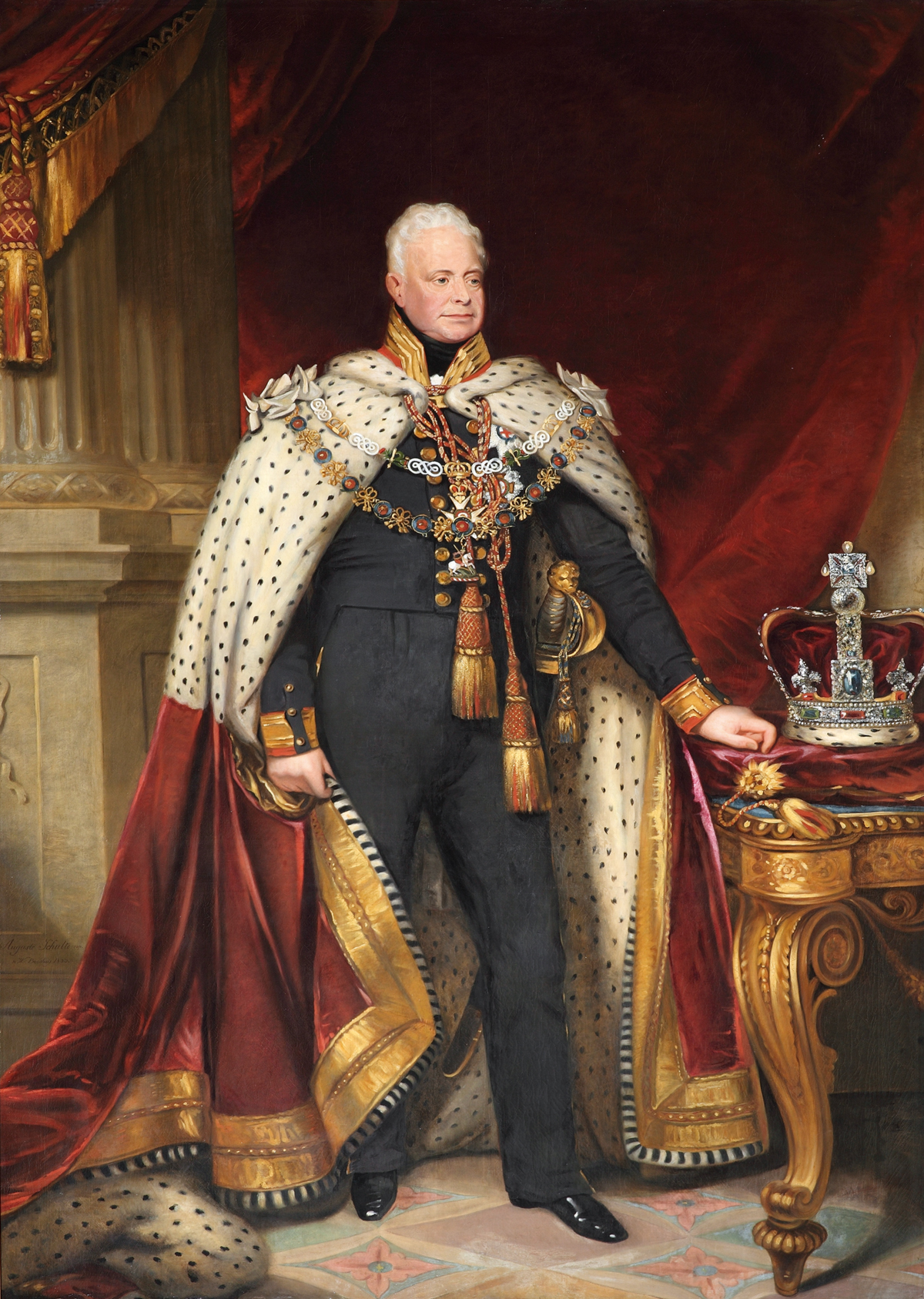
Portrait of William IV, c.1830

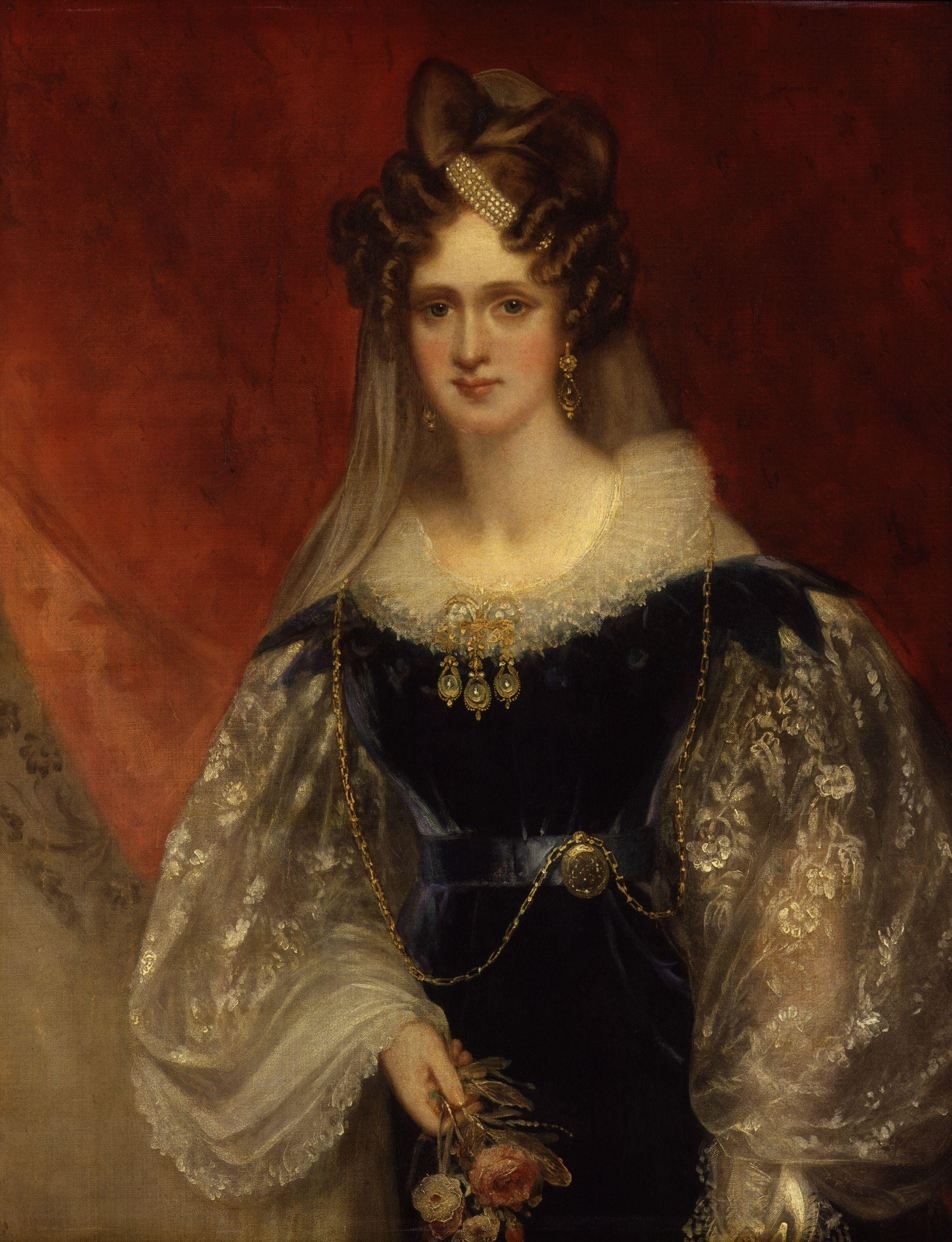
Queen Adelaide, c. 1831

== Coat of arms ==
Beechey was granted arms on 16 February 1829.

Coat of arms of William Beechey
Crest An eagle displayed Azure charged on the breast and wings with an ermine spot Or each claw resting on a chaplet as in the Arms. Escutcheon Per fess Azure and Ermine a pale counterchanged on a chevron Gules between three eagles displayed Or a knights helmet proper between two chaplets gold. Motto Persta Atque Obdura

== Sources ==
- Hermann, Like. Nineteenth Century British Painting. Charles de la Mare, 2000.
- Redgrave, Richard; Redgrave, Samuel (1947) [1890]. A Century of Painters of the English School. Sampson Low, Marston.
- Roberts, W. (1907). Sir William Beechey, R.A. London: Duckworth & Co.
- Chisholm, Hugh, ed. (1911). "Beechey, Sir William" . Encyclopædia Britannica. Vol. 3 (11th ed.). Cambridge University Press. p. 640.
- Laughton, John Knox (1885). "Beechey, Frederick William" . In Stephen, Leslie (ed.). Dictionary of National Biography. Vol. 4. London: Smith, Elder & Co.
