= Mahendra Patel =

Mahendra Patel may refer to:

- Mahendra Patel (engineer), American electrical engineer
- Mahendra Patel (politician), Indian politician from Gujarat
- Mahendra Patel (typeface designer), Indian typeface designer and teacher
- Mahendra Singh Patel, Indian politician from Uttar Pradesh
