= Gutenberg Prize of the International Gutenberg Society and the City of Mainz =

Award

The Gutenberg Prize of the International Gutenberg Society and the City of Mainz has been awarded since 1968 for outstanding artistic, technical and scientific achievements in the field of printing. The award was initially awarded every three years, since 1994 then in annual change with the Gutenberg Prize of the City of Leipzig, which also honors outstanding book art achievements. The Gutenberg Prize is endowed with 10,000 euros. The prize is named for the inventor of the movable-type printing press, Johannes Gutenberg, whose hometown was Mainz.

== Winners ==
2024	Valentyna Bochkovska, Kyiv/Ukraine; Director of the Museum of Book and Printing
2022	Jeffrey F. Hamburger, Cambridge/US; Professor of Art History
	Eckehart Schumacher-Gebler, Saarbrücken/Germany; Printer and professor of printmaking
2020	Gerhard Steidl, Göttingen/Germany; Printer and publisher
2018	Alberto Manguel, Buenos Aires/Argentina; Director of the National Library of Argentina and author
2016	Klaus-Dieter Lehmann, Berlin/Germany; Cultural manager and librarian
2014	Umberto Eco, Milan/Italy; Writer, philosoph and media scientist
2012	Elizabeth L. Eisenstein, Washington, D.C./US; Historian
2010	Mahendra Patel, Ahmedabad/India; Indian typeface designer and professor of typography
2008	Michael Knoche, Weimar/Germany; Director of the Duchess Anna Amalia Library / Foundation Weimar Classic
2006	Hubert Wolf, Münster/Germany; Professor of Medieval and Modern Church History
2004	Robert Darnton, New York City/US; Historian and cultural scientist
2002	Otto Rohse, Hamburg/Germany; Typographer, book designer, wood engraver and engraver, publisher of the Otto-Rohse-Presse
2000	Joseph M. Jacobson, Cambridge/US; Inventor and technologist
1998	Henri-Jean Martin, Paris/France; Book Historian
1996	John G. Dreyfus, London/UK; Typographer and book historian
1994	Paul Brainerd, Seattle/US; Pioneer of desktop publishing technology
1992	Ricardo José Vicent Museros, Valencia/Spain; Printer, publisher and founder of the first Spanish Print Museum
1989	Lotte Hellinga-Querido, London/UK; Incunabula researcher
1986	Adrian Frutiger, Bremgarten-Bern/Switzerland; Calligrapher
1983	Gerrit Willem Ovink, Amsterdam/Netherlands; Professor of History and Aesthetics of Printing Art
1980	Hellmuth Lehmann-Haupt, Columbia, MO/US; Book historian and university professor
1977	Rudolf Hell, Kiel/Germany; Inventor and technologist
1974	Hermann Zapf, Darmstadt/Germany; Typgrapher and book designer
1971	Henri Friedländer, Jerusalem/Israel; Typographer
1968	Giovanni Mardersteig, Verona/Italy; Printer, font and book designer
