= GXB =

GXB, GxB, or GXb may refer to:

- GXB Interactive, developer of two Game Boy Advance video games
- GXb, Belgian road sign code for the end of a parking regulation
- GxB, a type of dating sim video game
