= GXC =

GXC, GxC, or GXc may refer to:

- GXC, CJK Unified Ideographs code for Xiandai Hanyu Cidian, a Chinese-language dictionary
- GxC, abbreviation for People for Ciutadella, a party in the 2015 Spanish local elections in the Balearic Islands
- GXc, Belgian road sign code for a type of parking regulation sign
