= Gerrit Willem Ovink =

Dutch historian (1912–1984)

Geritt Willem Ovink
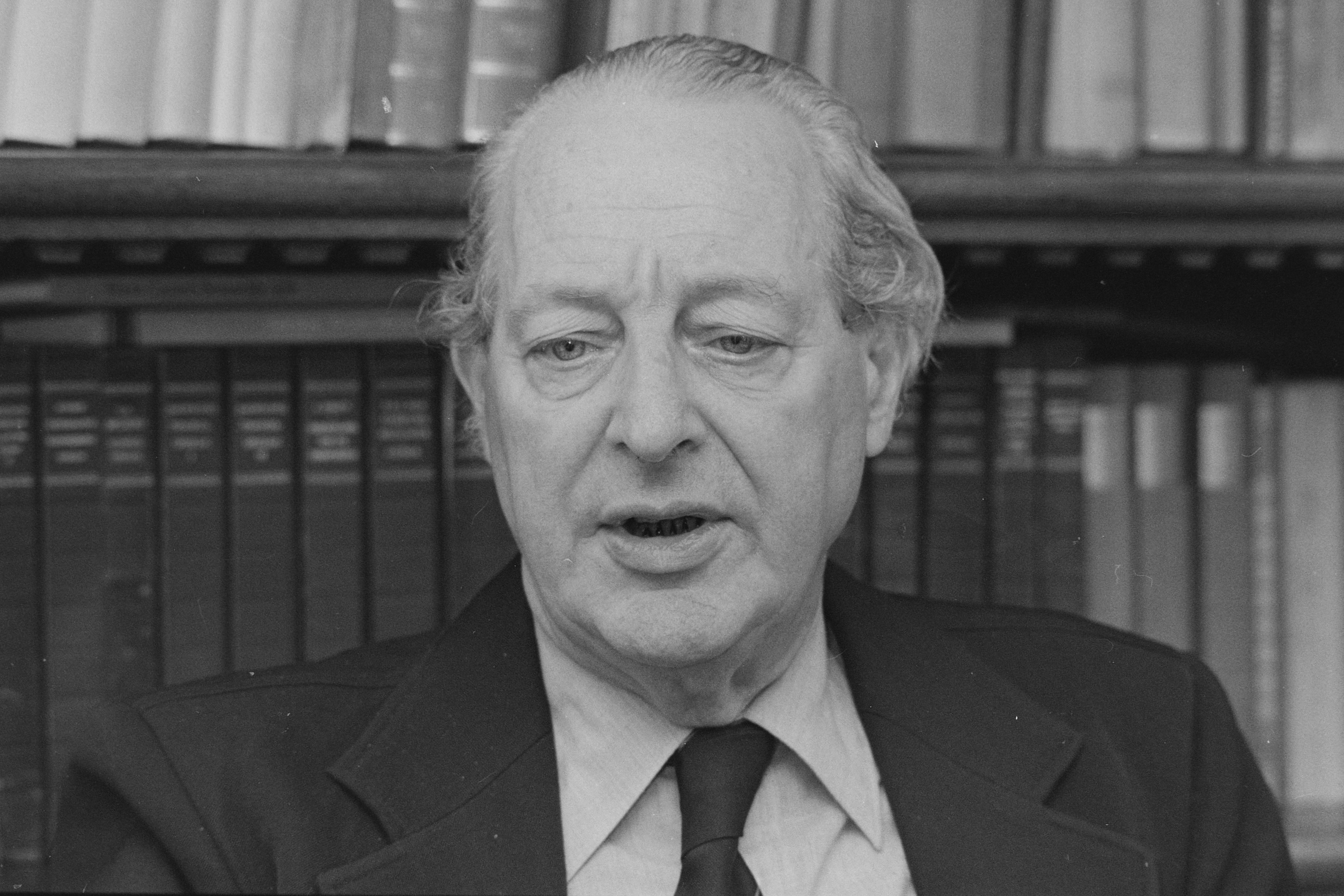
- G.W. Ovink (1983)
- Born: 22 October 1912
- Died: 4 February 1984 (aged 71); Amsterdam, Netherlands
- Known for: Graphic design

Geritt Willem Ovink (1912 - 1984) was a Dutch professor of History and Aesthetics of Printing Art, and legibility researcher. He was a laudator of the second Gutenberg Prize winner Henri Friedlaender.

Ovinik focused on the readability of modern pamphlets, and ventured with the re-casting of old writings of the 19th century, a "typographic revolution".

== Prizes and awards ==
In 1983, the Gerrit Willem Ovink received the Gutenberg Prize of the International Gutenberg Society and the City of Mainz for the re-casting of ancient writings (lost advertisements of the 19th century). The typeface Ovink is named after him.
