= Ricardo J. Vicent Museros =

Spanish printer and publisher (1938–2019)

Ricardo J. Vicent Museros (Turís, Valencia, 22 August 1938 – 23 February 2019) was a Spanish printer and publisher. After studying in Germany he returned to Valencia with new methods of work, advertising and graphic marketing. He founded the "Museo Nacional de la Imprenta y la Obra Gráfica" (National Printing and Graphic Works Museum) in El Puig de Santa María (Valencia, Spain). He promoted the twinning of the cities of Valencia and Mainz (Germany). In 1992, the International Gutenberg Society granted him the "Gutenberg Prize" and in 2003 he received the "Cross of Civil Merit" from the German government for his work in favour of cultural relations between Spain and Germany.

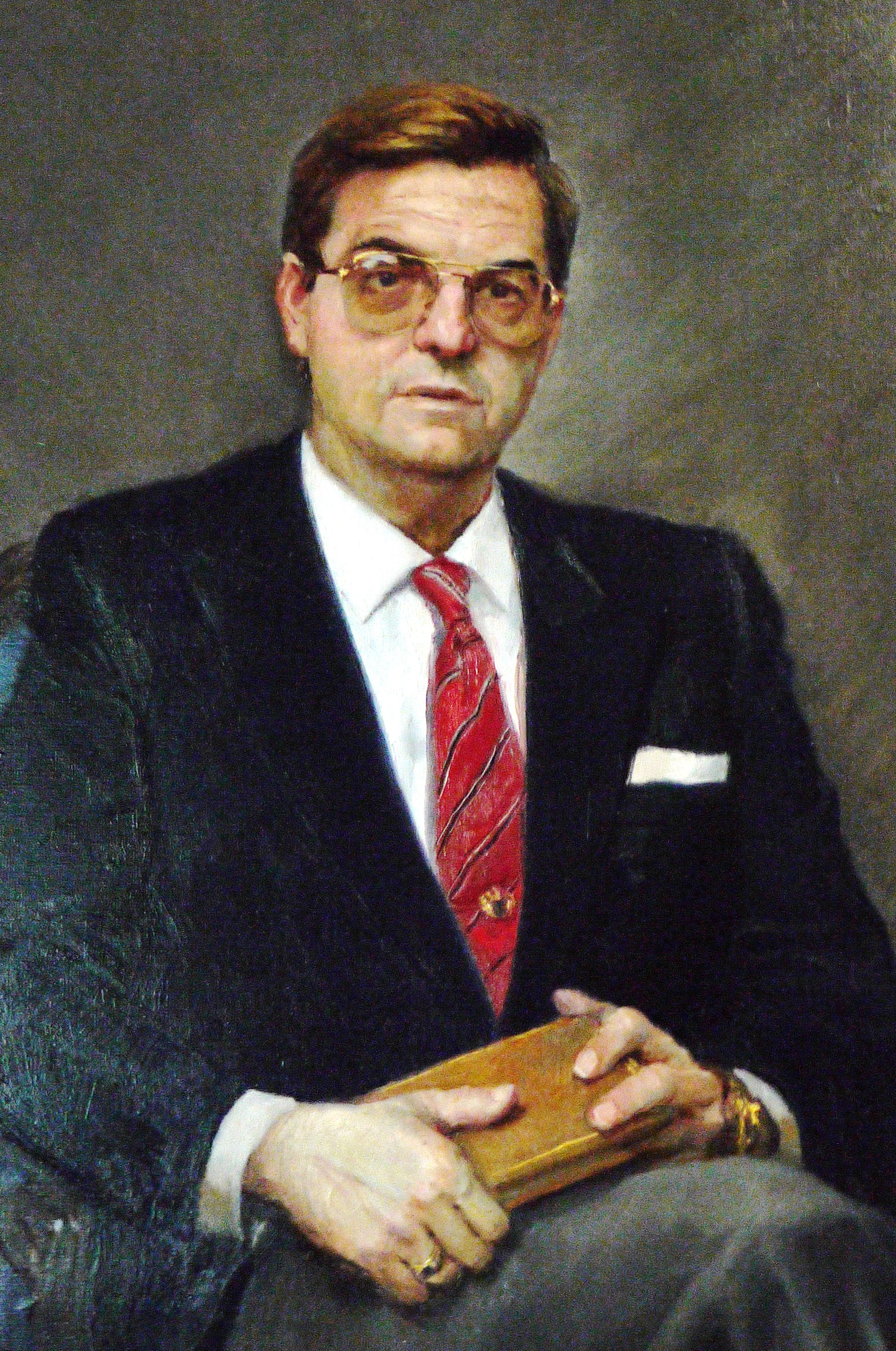
Ricardo J. Vicent Museros. Portrait painted by Luis Arcas Brauner.

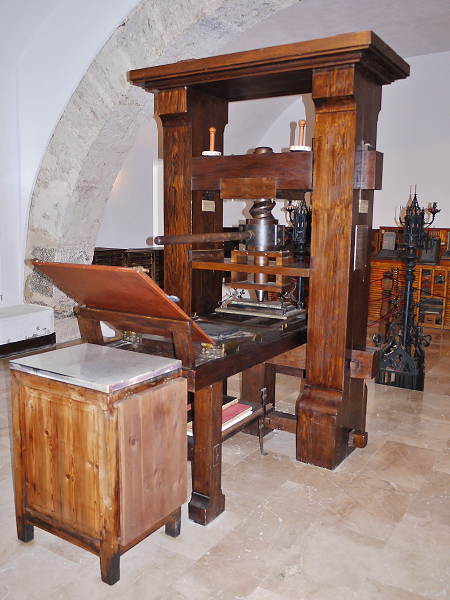
Replica of the Gutenberg Printing Press kept at the Printing Museum in El Puig (Valencia, Spain).

== Biography ==
Son of Ricardo Vicent Carbonell and Concepción Museros Rodes, he studied at the "Alliance Française" and "Colegio de los PP. Dominicos" (Dominican Fathers School) of Valencia. He studied Commercial Evaluation at the "School of Commerce" in Valencia. Between 1956 and 1959 he studied in Germany, where he graduated as a technician in photomechanical reproduction ("Klimsch-Repro-Studio", Frankfurt) with work experience in different printing industry factories in the country.

He was the fourth generation of a family of printers that began working around 1860 in Castellón (Spain), where he trained in all printing techniques with his uncles Francisco and José Segarra ("Imprenta Segarra", Calle del Medio, 53).

Following the family tradition, his father Ricardo Vicent Carbonell founded a printers in Valencia, at Calle Salamanca 62, in 1941 ("Gráficas Vicent"). Ricardo J. Vicent inherited the workshop and later founded several companies: «Vicent García Editores», «DFC Publicidad», «Asociación de Coleccionistas de Arte», «Publicaciones Gráficas» and «Gravisa».

At the printing workshop of his hometown, El Puig de Santa María, he printed original works for artists of his time such as: Adami, Alfaro, Arcas, Arroyo, María Girona, Lozano, Conrado Meseguer, Michavila, Toni Miró, Hernández Mompó, Ortuño, Sacramento, Eusebio Sempere, Soria, Tapies...

He retired from working at his printing businesses in 1995 due to illness.

== Twinning between Valencia and Mainz ==
As a result of his cultural contacts with Germany and his professional activity, in 1977 he promoted the twinning of the cities of Mainz (Germany) and Valencia (Spain), using the birth of printing as a reference: Mainz, where the Gutenberg Bible or The 42-line Bible was printed, a key book in movable font printing (Gutenberg Workshop, Mainz, 1454); and Valencia, which saw the first literary work printed in Spain, Obres o trobes en lahors de la Verge Maria (written in Catalan language, by Bernat Fenollar and others, at the Lambert Palmart workshop, Valencia, 1474).

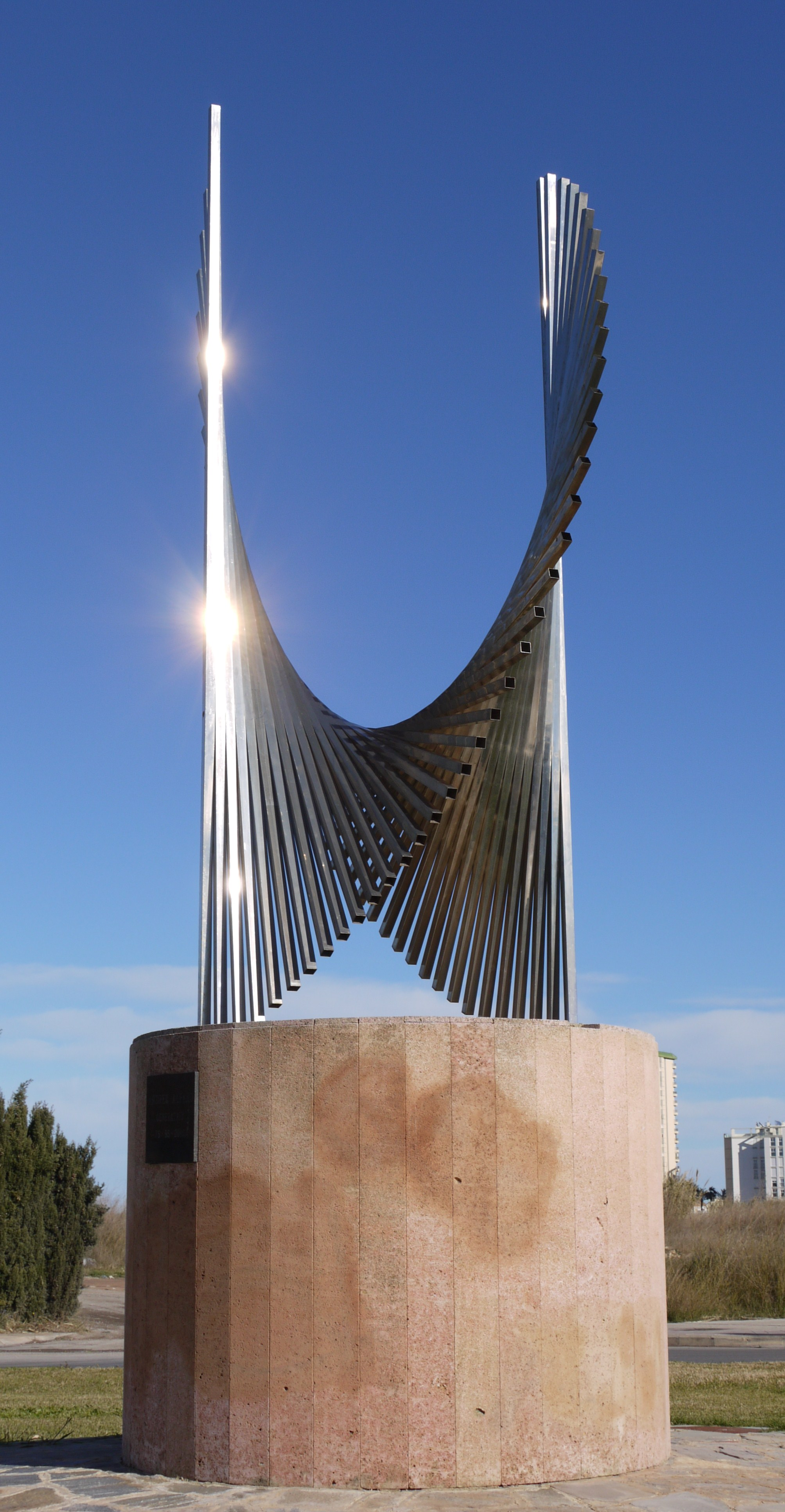
"Un nou día" ("A new day"), sculpture by Andreu Alfaro. 1974. In El Puig de Santa María (Valencia-Spain).

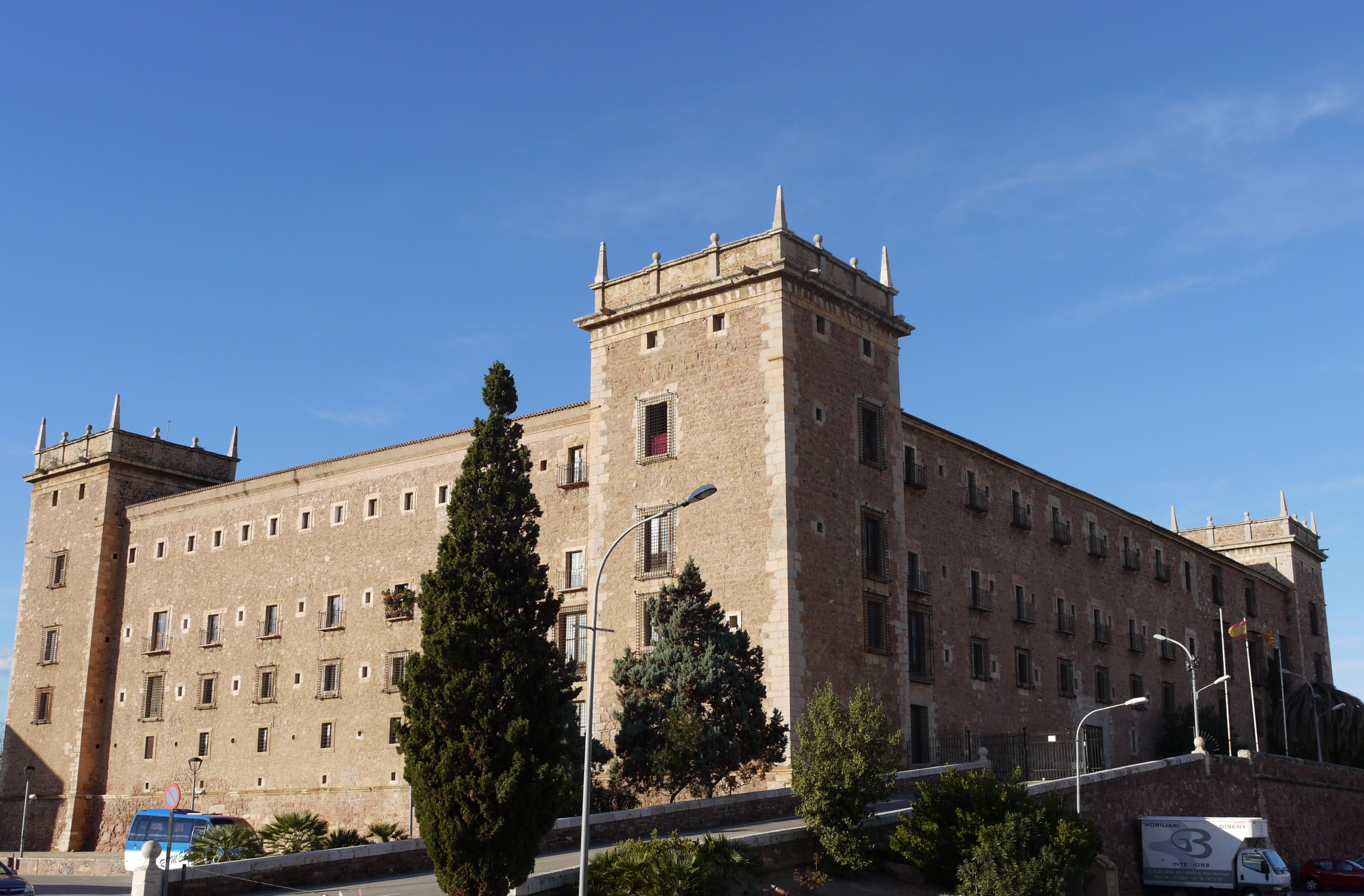
View of the Royal Monastery of Santa María del Puig (Valencia, Spain), home to the Printing Museum.

== "National Printing and Graphic Works Museum" and El Puig ==
His contact with the "Gutenberg Museum" in Mainz (Germany), created by the "International Gutenberg Society", led him to found the "National Printing and Graphic Works Museum" in Valencia in 1987. Thanks to the collaboration of the Order of Mercy, owners of the Monastery of Santa María del Puig, the museum was housed in this building. He received help from the printing sector in Valencia and Spain, particularly: José Huguet («Archivo Huguet», Valencia) and Gonzalo Sales («Farinetti», Valencia). The museum consisted of old printing machines and elements related to publishing, engraving and books kept by his family of printers for decades, with contributions from all over Spain and acquisitions to cover relevant gaps. In 2000, he donated the museum to the Generalitat Valenciana (Regional Government of Valencia).

His love for and relationship with the town of El Puig de Santa María, home to the Museum of Printing, led him to gradually grant eleven sculptures, which can be seen in the squares and streets of the town.

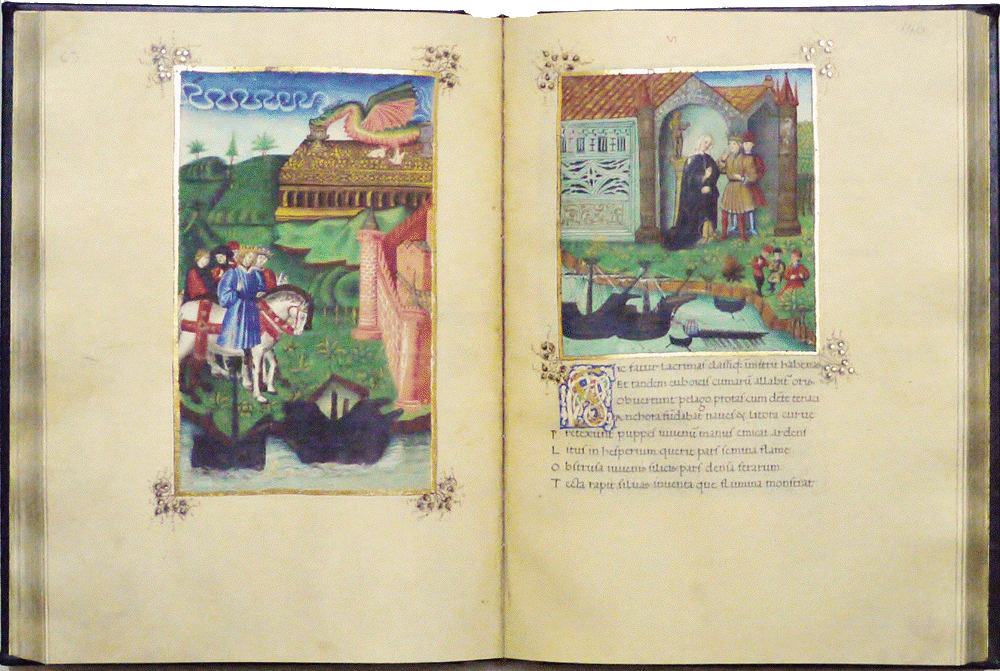
Eclogues, Georgics and Aenid by Virgil. Facsimile of codex 837 of the Universitat de València.

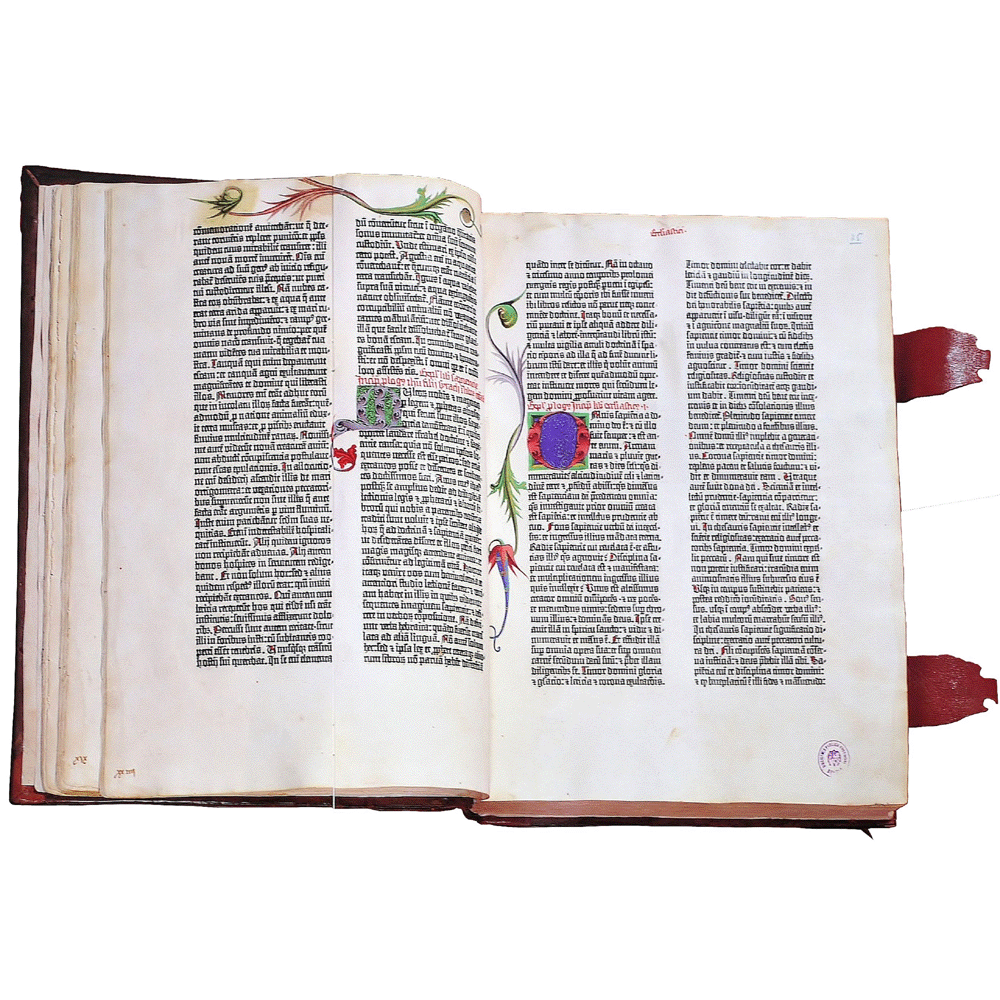
The Gutenberg Bible or The 42-line Bible. Mainz, 1454. Facsimile of The Gutenberg Bible of Burgos.

== Vicent García Editores ==
He created Vicent García Editores in 1974. The firm published several limited edition, numbered facsimiles of manuscripts, incunabula and old books, as well as encyclopaedias on Valencian culture.

=== Facsimiles of codices ===
The most outstanding of the illuminated manuscript facsimiles published by Vicent García Editores include: A curious heart-shaped codex Chansonnier de Jean de Montchenu or Chansonnier Cordiforme (ms. Rothschild 2937 Bibliothèque nationale de France); or the Neapolitan codex Eclogues, Georgics and Aenid by Virgil (ms. 837, Historical Library of the Universitat de València).

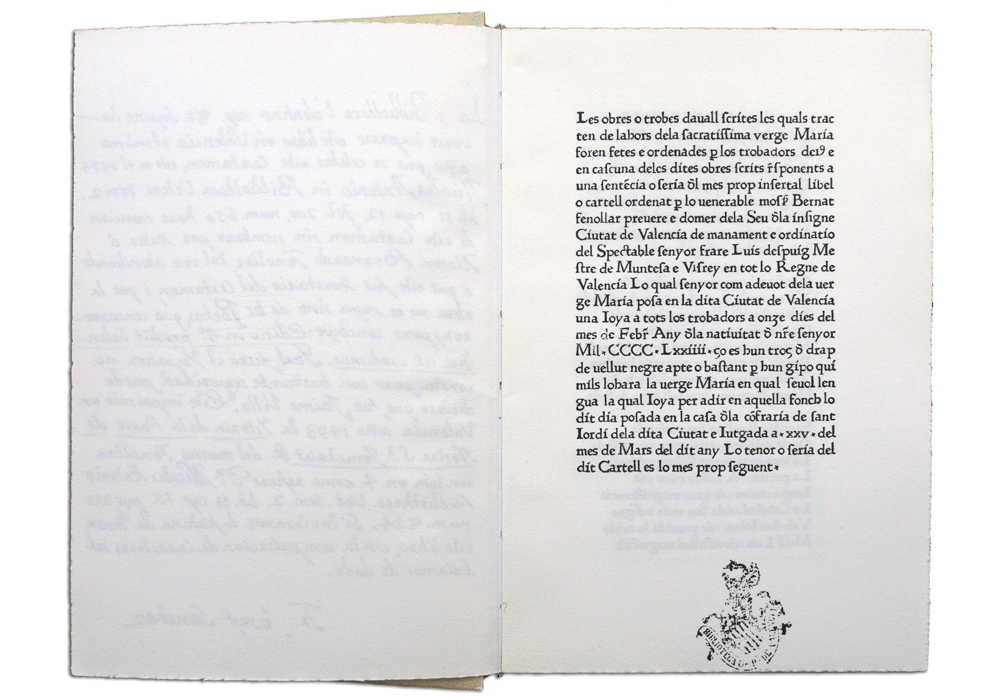
Obres o trobes en lahors de la Verge Maria. Valencia, 1474. Facsimile of the first literary work printed in Spain.

=== Facsimiles of early printed books: Incunabula and old books ===
A relevant publication in this category is the facsimile of The 42-line Bible, printed by Gutenberg (1454) with movable fonts. The copy chosen for reproduction was the one found in the Biblioteca Pública del Estado (State Public Library) in Burgos, Spain.

Under his publishing brand he created the "International Bibliophile Society. Club Konrad Haebler", which has published a collection of facsimiles of incunabula and old books by different authors and on different themes. These were first made popular through printing during the Renaissance, as can be seen by some of their titles:

- Obres o trobes en lahors de la Verge Maria by Bernat Fenollar and others
- Gramática castellana by Nebrija
- Liber chronicarum by Schedel
- Viaje a la Tierra Sancta by Breidenbach
- Mujeres ilustres by Boccaccio
- Libro primero de la architectura by Paladio
- Hypnerotomachia Poliphili by Franciscus Columna
- Tragicomedia de Calisto y Melibea by Fernando de Rojas
- Los cuatro libros de la guerra by Sextus Julius Frontinus (Strategematicon)
- Meditationes by Torquemada
- Poeticon astronomicon by Hyginus
- Historia de yervas y plantas by Fuchs
- Divina proportione by Pacioli
- Suma aritmética by Andrés
- Historia de la composición del cuerpo humano by Juan Valverde de Amusco
- Breve compendio de la sphera by Cortés
- Origen de la caza by Mateos
- Ejercicios de la gineta by Tapia and Salcedo
- Libro de guisados by Ruperto de Nola
- De le meravegliose cose del mondo by Marco Polo

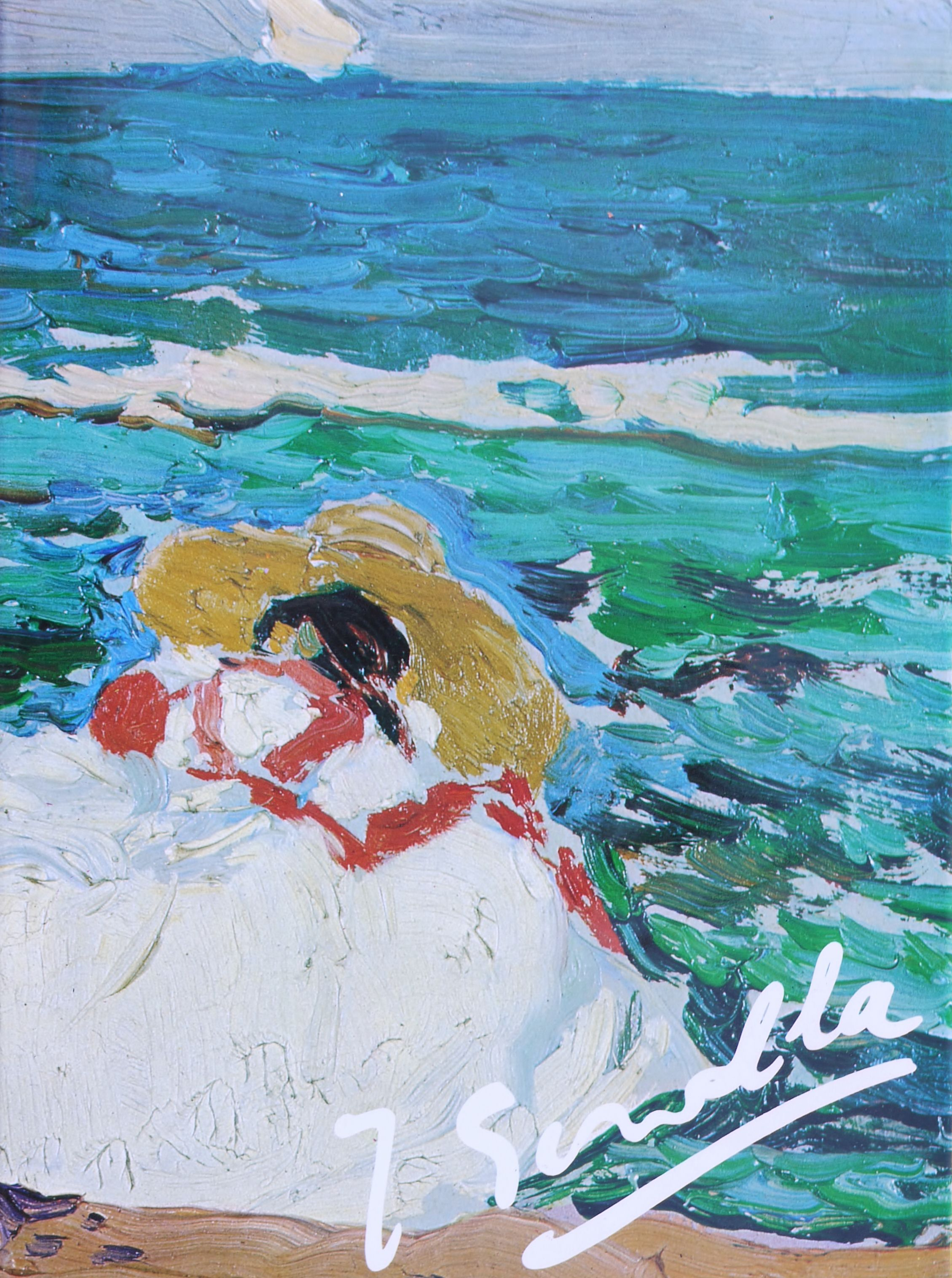
Sorolla, by Trinidad Simó Terol.

=== Valencian themed publications ===
He published a series of books dedicated to the Region of Valencia (Alicante, Castellón and Valencia), revealing its history, customs and artists in order to promote further studies and the dissemination of these issues. The main collections are:

- Nuestras tierras (9 vol.).
- «Valencian Themed»: Nuestras fiestas, Nuestros vinos, Nostres menjars, Nuestras monedas, Nuestras hierbas.
- «Our Museums»: Benlliure, Prehistoria, Xàtiva, Elche y La Alcudia, Alicante, Segorbe.
- "Pentalogy": Furs, Consolat de mar, Repartiment, Feyts, Privilegis de València.
- "Valencian Painters": Sorolla, Pinazo, Mompó, Michavila, Genaro Lahuerta, Arcas, Lozano.
- "Valencian Sculptors and Artists": Octavio Vicent, Sacramento, Edeta, Edo, Mestre, Furió.
- Historia de la cerámica valenciana (4 vol.)
- Historia de la medicina valenciana (3 vol.)
- "Homenaje a Blasco Ibáñez" (4 vol.)

== Posts and appointments ==
- Chairman of the Marketing Club of Valencia.
- Chairman and founder of the Museo Nacional de la Imprenta y de la Obra Gráfica (National Printing and Graphic Works Museum).
- Chairman of the International Graphic Art Fair (FMI Valencia).
- Chairman of the Association of Publishers of Valencia.
- Vice-chairman of the Association of Graphic Industrialists of Valencia
- Member of Sales & Marketing Executives International.
- Member of the International Advertising Association.
- Member of the Board of the Chamber of Commerce, Industry and Navigation of Valencia.
- Member of the Executive Committee of the International Trade Fair (FMI Valencia).
- Vice-chairman of the trade fairs DIPA and INTERARTE (FMI Valencia).
- Founding member of the Advertising Club of Valencia.
- Member of the Skal Club (Valencia Atracción – Turismo Valencia Convention Bureau).
- Grand Commander of the Real Orden de Caballeros de Santa María del Puig (Royal Order of Knights of Santa María del Puig).
- Member of the Master Association of Gastronomy.
- Member of the Confrérie des Chevaliers du Tastevin del château Duclos de Vougeot (Dijon, France).
- Past-President of the Rotary Club of Valencia (Paul Harris Fellow).
- Founder of the Mediterranean Rotary Club (New club Award).
- Senator of the International Gutenberg Society (Mainz, Germany).
- Member of the Executive Committee (Presidium) of the International Gutenberg Society (Mainz, Germany).
- Member of the Maximilian-Gesellschaft (Stuttgart, Germany).
- Academic for the Real Academia de Bellas Artes de San Carlos (San Carlos Royal Academy of Fine Arts) of Valencia.
- Academic of the Real Académia de Cultura Valenciana (Royal Academy of Valencian Culture).

== Recognitions ==
- "Almena de Márketing" from the Economy and Management Club.
- "Prócer de Valencia" ("Dignitary of Valencia") from the Faculty of Law of the University of Valencia (1975–1980).
- "Honorary Consul" of the Consulate of La Lonja de Valencia.
- "Cavanilles Award" from the Association of Tourism Journalists of Valencia.
- "Valencia Graphic Arts Award" from the Diputación de Valencia (Regional Province of Valencia).
- "National Graphic Arts Award" from Graphispag (Barcelona).
- "José Roig Otto Graphic Arts Award" (Barcelona).
- "José María Henche Villamide Award" (Madrid).
- "First prize" in the "Typographic Art" Creative Printing Competition (Philadelphia, USA).
- "First prize" of North American Publishing (New York City).
- "Honorary Mention" from the Internationale Senefelder-Stiftung of Offenbach am Main (R.F.A.).
- "Honorary Mention for the Best Book Published" at the Felice Feliciano Awards (Verona, Italy) to his publishing house Asociación de Coleccionistas de Arte, for El Palio de Siena by Alessandro Falassi and Eduardo Arroyo.
- "Best Book Published Award" in 1990 by the Ministry of Culture (Madrid, Spain) to his publishing house Vicent García Editores, for the facsimile of the manuscript Atlas de Historia Natural de Felipe II, Jardín de Cámara or Pomar Codex.
- "1992 Gutenberg Prize" from the International Gutenberg Society and the city of Mainz (Germany).
- "1992 Graphispag Trade Fair Medal" (Barcelona).
- "Silver Merit Medal" in 1998 from the Official Chamber of Commerce, Industry and Navigation of Valencia.
- "Gold Medal" from the Association of Graphic Industrialists of Valencia and Province.
- "Cross of Civil Merit" from the German Government in 2003.

== Exhibitions ==
- "Expolibri 2000", at the Biblioteca Nacional de España (Spanish National Library, Madrid), held an exhibition organised by the Guild Association of Graphic Art and Paper Entrepreneurs of Madrid, which selected the best books of the 20th century. Vicent García Editores was represented by 9 titles.
- In 2001, the International Gutenberg Society (Mainz, Germany) dedicated its 100th-anniversary exhibition to works published by Ricardo J. Vicent.
- In 2003, the University of Alcalá de Henares and the Centro de Estudios Cisnerianos (Alcalá de Henares, Madrid, Spain) held an exhibition entitled "Pasión por los libros" (Passion for books) at Palace of Laredo, dedicated to the work of Vicent García Editores.
- Permanent exhibition of the work of Vicent García Editores at the National Printing Museum and the Monastery of Santa María del Puig (Valencia, Spain).

== Bibliography ==
- Millán Sánchez, Fernando. Ricardo J. Vicent. Forjando la identidad valenciana. Valencia: Graciela Ediciones, 2010. ISBN 978-84-614-3899-0.
- Keim, Anton M.; López Blasco, Andreu; González Lizondo, Vicente; Weyel, Herman-Hartmut; Briesemeister, Dietrich; Vicent Museros, Ricardo J. Ricardo J. Vicent Museros. Gutenberg Preisträger 1992. Mainz: Gutenberg-Gesellschaft, 1993. ISBN 3-7755-2110-0.

=== Additional bibliography ===
- Vicent, Ricardo J. Gutenberg. Y los orígenes de la imprenta en España. Conferencia de Ricardo J. Vicent Museros con motivo de su ingreso en la Real Academia de Bellas Artes de San Carlos de Valencia. Román de la Calle. «Laudatio». Valencia: Real Academia de Bellas Artes de San Carlos, 2008.
- Vicent, Ricardo J. El taller de imprenta de Lambert Palmart. Discurso leído el día 6 de marzo de 2012 en su recepción como académico de número y contestación del académico Ilmo. Sr. D. Vicente L. Simó Santonja. Valencia: Real Academia de Cultura Valenciana, 2012.
