= Michael Knoche =

Germanist and librarian (born 1951)

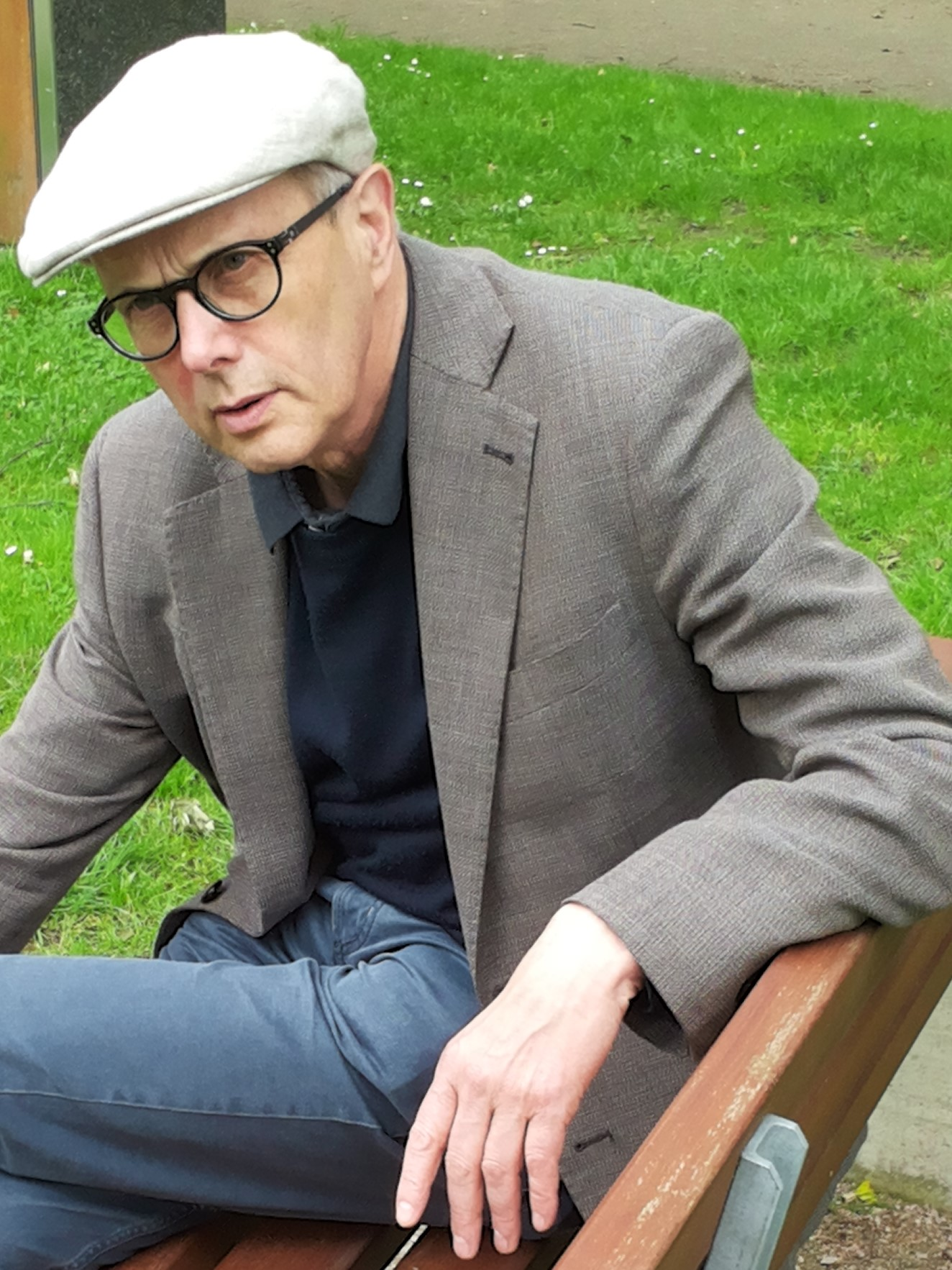
Michael Knoche (2019)

Michael Knoche (born in Werdohl, Germany, 1951) is a German librarian and promotor of the social role of libraries. He has received the Order of Merit of the Federal Republic of Germany, the Gutenberg Prize of the City of Mainz, and he is a member of the International Gutenberg Society. In 2004, Knoche rescued the Luther Bible when the Herzogin Anna Amalia Library caught on fire.

Knoche studied German philology from 1971 to 1979. He completed training for the higher library service in Karlsruhe and Cologne from 1978 to 1980. In 1985, he received his doctorate in Tübingen, and then worked as a research assistant at the Springer-Verlag in Heidelberg. From 1991 to 2016 he was director of the Central Library of German Classical (later Duchess Anna Amalia Library).

In the documentary "Die Bibliothek brennt", Michael Knoche explained the fire of the Duchess Anna Amalia Library in 2004, where he led the rescue work.
