= Road signs in the Netherlands =

L401: Dutch national standard speed limit signs at land borders.

Road signs in the Kingdom of the Netherlands (mainland Netherlands and six Dutch Caribbean islands) are regulated in the Reglement verkeersregels en verkeerstekens 1990, commonly abbreviated as RVV 1990. While most old signs of RVV 1966 remained legal and official, they have been updated/replaced. Although some signs no longer have legal validity, most surviving old signs remain valid.

== History ==
The history of Dutch traffic signs began in the late 19th century with the Royal Dutch Touring Club (ANWB), founded in 1883, which installed the first direction signs for cyclists in 1892 and by 1913 had shifted focus to automobile traffic. The organization introduced the iconic concrete paddenstoel (mushroom) signs in 1919—designed by architect J.H.W. Leliman following a 1918 design competition, with the first twelve installed between Laren and Baarn. These distinctive signs were designed to be readable by cyclists looking down rather than up, allowing them to maintain speed and momentum without stopping.

The Netherlands also played a decisive role in the international effort to standardise road signs, a movement that began in the early 20th century and culminated in the visual language still recognised across Europe today. Early international efforts, such as the 1908 and 1926 World Road Congresses, focused on a limited set of warning signs for motorists. The push for a more comprehensive system gained momentum with the League of Nations, leading to the pivotal 1931 Geneva Convention concerning the unification of road signs.

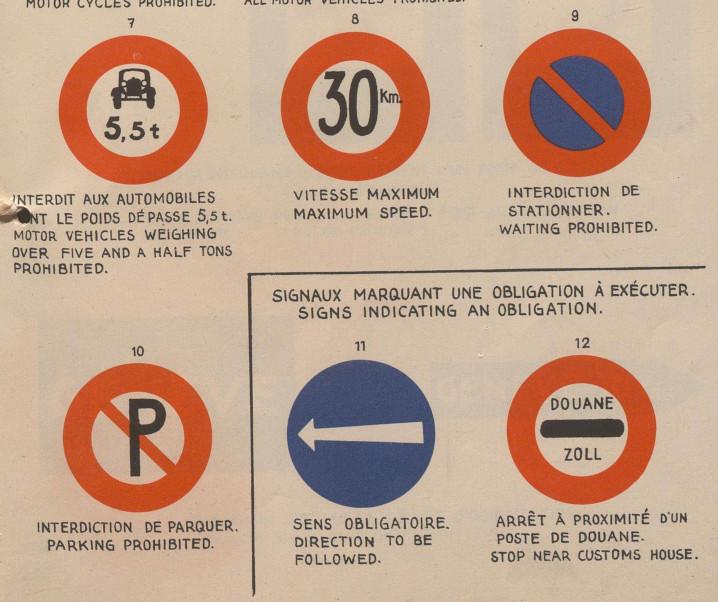
1931 Dutch proposal for universal road signs at the League of Nations.

During the negotiations, a significant controversy arose over the design of "no waiting" and "no parking" signs. The preliminary draft proposed signs without the now-familiar diagonal stroke. The Dutch delegation, represented by G.F. Schönfeld, Administrator at the Dutch Ministry of Waterstaat (Rijkswaterstaat's predecessor), actively proposed alternative designs, including a round white sign with a red border and the letter 'P' for parking prohibition. While this specific proposal was not adopted in its entirety, the matter was referred to a special sub-committee that ultimately forged a compromise. Their final recommendation, which became part of the 1931 convention, introduced the diagonal red stroke as the key visual element for prohibition signs, alongside triangular signs for danger, round signs for prohibitions and obligations, and rectangular signs for information.

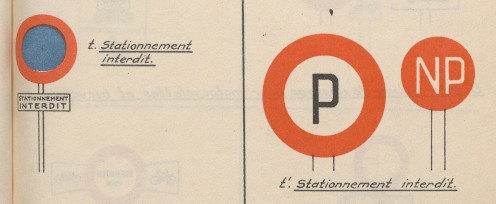
Controversial parking sign of the 1930 Dutch proposal.

The Netherlands ratified this convention in 1934 with a five-year transition period for implementation. The first comprehensive national regulations came with the Wegenverkeersregeling of 1941 – under Nazi occupation – which codified these principles in Dutch law and required all old signs to be replaced by December 1942. An undated Dutch road atlas from around 1945 already featured a set of such signs, showing the early adoption and influence of these international standards within the Netherlands itself.

The foundations laid by the Netherlands and others in 1931 directly influenced the later, more comprehensive 1968 Vienna Convention on Road Signs and Signals, creating the broadly uniform European signing system that eventually effected designs globally.

== Series A: Speed restrictions ==
A1: Speed limit (50 km/h)

A2: End of speed limit (50 km/h)

A3: Speed limit displayed on an electronic display panel (VMS)

A4: Advisory speed

A5: End of advisory speed

== Series B: Priority (Right of way) ==
B1: Priority road

B2: End of priority road

B3: Crossroads with priority

B4: Road junction with priority over minor road from the left

B5: Road junction with priority over minor road from the right

B6: Give Way sign, must give priority to other traffic on the main road ahead

B7: Stop: Give priority to traffic on the main road ahead

== Series C: Access control, prohibitory and mandatory ==
C1: Road closed in both directions to vehicles, riders and persons in charge of animals or livestock.

C2: No entry in this direction for vehicular traffic, horse riders and persons in charge of animals or livestock.

C3: One-way street.

C4: One-way street.

C5: Access permitted for both directions.

C6: No access for motorised vehicles with more than two wheels.

C7: No access for trucks.

C7a: No access for buses.

C7b: No access for buses and trucks.

C8: No access for agricultural vehicles.

C9: No access for (horse) riders, livestock, wagons, agricultural and forestry tractors, motor vehicles with limited speed, mobile machines, microcars, bicycles, mopeds, scooters and mobility vehicles.

C10: No access for motor vehicle with towing trailers.

C11: No access for motorcycles.

C12: No access for all motorised vehicles.

C13: No access for mopeds, motor-assisted bicycles or motorised mobility vehicles.

C14: No access for bicycles or non-motorised mobility vehicles.

C15: No access for bicycles, mopeds and mobility vehicles.

C16: No access for pedestrians.

C17: No access for vehicles or combinations of vehicles which, including their load, are longer than indicated on the sign.

C18: No access for vehicles which, including their load, are wider than indicated on the sign.

C19: No access for vehicles which, including their load, are higher than indicated on the sign.

C20: No access for vehicles with an axle load higher than indicated on the sign.

C21: No access for vehicles and combinations of vehicles whose total weight is higher than indicated on the sign.

C22: No access for vehicles carrying hazardous substances.

C22e: Environmental zone: no access for vehicles not compliant with article 86d of RVV 1990

C22e1 (sub-panel): Environmental zone: no access for all commercial vehicles

C22e4 (sub-panel): Environmental zone: diesel-powered personal vehicles, accessible for cars with emission class Euro 4 to 6

C22e5 (sub-panel): Environmental zone: diesel-powered personal vehicles, accessible for cars with emission class Euro 5 and 6

C22e6 (sub-panel): Environmental zone: diesel-powered personal- and commercial vehicles, accessible for vehicles with emission class Euro 4 to 6

C22e7 (sub-panel): Environmental zone: diesel-powered personal- and commercial vehicles, accessible for vehicles with emission class Euro 5 and 6

C22e8 (sub-panel): Environmental zone: diesel-powered trucks, accessible for trucks with emission class Euro 6

C22e9 (sub-panel): Environmental zone: diesel-powered buses, accessible for buses with emission class Euro 6

C22e10 (sub-panel): Environmental zone: trucks and buses, accessible for trucks and buses with emission class Euro 6

C22f: End of environmental- (zero-emission) zone

C23-01: Rush-hour lane (shoulder) open

C23-02: Clear out of rush-hour lane (shoulder)

C23-03: End of Rush-hour lane (shoulder)

== Series D: Signs giving positive instructions ==
D1: Roundabout – give way to vehicles on the immediate left

D2: Instruction to all drivers to keep to the right of the sign (or left if arrow is reversed)

D3: The sign may be passed on either side

D4: Instruction to drive ahead only

D5: Instruction to follow the direction ahead shown by the arrow

D6: Instruction to follow one of the directions ahead shown by the arrows

D7: Instruction to follow one of the directions ahead shown by the arrows

== Series E: Parking and stopping ==
E1: No parking

E2: No stopping

E3: No parking for bicycles or mopeds

E4: Parking area

E5: Taxi rank

E6: Parking for disabled drivers + BT17 sub-panel for designating license plate number

E7: Parking permitted for the immediate loading and unloading of goods only

E8: Parking facilities only for the category or group of vehicle shown

E9: Parking for permit-holders only

E10: Entrance to controlled parking zone

E11: End of controlled parking zone

E12: Park and ride facilities

E13: Parking facilities for car sharers

== Series F: Other mandatory signs ==
F1: No overtaking

F2: End of no overtaking zone

F3: No overtaking of cars by lorries

F4: End of zone with no overtaking of cars by lorries

F5: Give way to oncoming vehicles

F6: Priority over oncoming vehicles

F7: No U-turns

F8: End of all restrictions imposed by traffic signs

F9: End of all restrictions imposed by electronic signalling panels (VMS)

F10: Stop. The sign can also contain further information as to whom it is directed and why

F11: Compulsory use of passing lane for slow motor vehicles (under 25 km/h)

F12: End of passing lane for slow motor vehicles

F13: Bus lane

F14: End of bus lane

F15: Tram lane

F16: End of tram lane

F17: Bus and tram lane

F18: End of bus and tram lane

F19: Compulsory use of lane only for trucks and buses

F20: End of lane only for trucks and buses

F21: Compulsory use of lane only for trucks

F22: End of lane only for trucks

== Series G: Traffic regulations ==
G1: Motorway

G2: End of motorway

G3: Expressway

G4: End of Expressway

G5: Living street

G6: End of Living street

G7: Footpath

G8: End of footpath

G9: Bridleway

G10: End of bridleway

G11: Route for pedal cycles only

G12: End of pedal cycles route

G12a: Route for pedal cycle and mopeds only

G12b: End of route for pedal cycles and mopeds

G13: Optional cycle path

G14: End of optional cycle path

== Series H: Name plate for built-up area ==
H1: Built-up area

H2: End of built-up area

== Series J: Warning signs ==
J1: Uneven road

J2: Bend to right

J3: Bend to left

J4: Double bend, first to right

J5: Double bend, first to left

J6: Steep hill upward

J7: Steep hill downward

J8: Dangerous crossing

J9: Roundabout

J10: Level crossing with barrier or gates ahead

J11: Level crossing without barrier or gates ahead

J12: Level crossing with single track

J13: Level crossing with two or more tracks

J14: Tram (crossing) ahead

J15: Opening or swing bridge ahead

J16: Road works ahead

J17: Road narrows on both sides

J18: Road narrows on the right side

J19: Road narrows on the left side

J20: Slippery road

J21: School crossing

J22: Pedestrian crossing

J23: Pedestrians

J24: Cyclists and moped riders

J25: Loose chippings

J26: Quayside or river bank

J27: Wild animals

J28: Domesticated animals

J29: Two-way traffic

J30: Low-flying aircraft

J31: Side winds

J32: Traffic lights

J33: Queues likely

J34: Danger of accidents

J35: Reduced visibility because of snow, rain or fog

J36: Risk of ice or snow

J37: Other dangers

J38: Warning bump

J39: Warning for retractable bollard (poller) in the traffic lane that can be used to regulate access to streets and areas.

BB23-1: Level crossing distance board (close, each bar usually indicate 80 or 100m)

BB23-2: level crossing distance board (between, each bar usually indicate 80 or 100m)

BB23-3: level crossing distance board (far, each bar usually indicate 80 or 100m)

== Series K: Wayfinding ==
While the Reglement verkeersregels en verkeerstekens 1990 (RVV 1990) regulates traffic rules and the majority of traffic signs in the Netherlands, directional signage for wayfinding follows a separate set of guidelines. These signs are designed according to the Richtlijn Bewegwijzering, a directive developed and maintained collaboratively by the Nationale Bewegwijzeringsdienst (NBd) and the CROW knowledge platform. The NBd is legally responsible for ensuring all directional sign plans in the country are consistent with this specific guideline, which covers everything from highway signs to cycling route wayfinding, to guarantee uniformity and reliability for all road users.

=== The following section displays the RVV version of such signage ===
K1: Low level motorway information sign showing both main and intermediary destinations and the motorway number (old)

K2: Advance warning sign of a motorway showing the distance to the next exit and destinations after the exit (the top destination is the name of the exit), direction to aerodrome/airport and the road number (non-motorway)(old)

K3: Information sign for exit to motorway service area, showing the name of the rest area and symbols for the services offered (with pictograms from Richtlijn Bewegwijzering 2014 )

K4: High level motorway information sign showing lane instructions for through traffic and exit panel showing intermediary destinations, with the motorway number and European route numbers (old)

K5: Non-motorway advance information panel showing intermediary destinations, road numbers, a viaduct symbol and a sign for an industrial zone

K6: Non-motorway information panels showing intermediary destinations and non-motorway road numbers

K7: Signposts for cyclists and moped riders (finger posts) showing local and intermediary destinations, municipal cycle route numbers (above) and showing intermediary destinations and intermediary cycle route numbers (below)

K8: Signposts (multiple) for cyclists and moped riders showing intermediary destinations and indicating an alternative route (in italics) to one of the destinations

K9: Diversion with alternative route shown on an advance warning panel for a non-motorway highway

K10: Advance warning panel within a built-up area showing an intermediary destination, local destinations, local tourist sights, local facilities and road numbers through the town

K11: Lane instructions on a non-motorway highway. Panel showing intermediary destinations, road numbers and directions to a motorway

K12: Local signpost within a built-up area showing names of individual districts (in traffic areas)

K13: Signpost within a built-up area showing district numbers (in traffic areas)

K14: Route for the conveyance of hazardous materials

BB01: Exit (for controlled-access roads)

=== The following are examples demonstrating those separate guidelines that is currently being used for the signs in practice ===
K4 according to Rijkswaterstaat design guidelines

Wayfinding signs on non-motorway (K6, K7 and K8) according to the Richtlijn Bewegwijzering 2025

== Series L: Information ==
L1: No vehicles over height shown, underpass

L2: Pedestrian crossing

L3a: Tram stop/bus stop

L3b: Bus stop

L3c: Tram stop

L4: Get in lane

L5: End of lane

L6: Lane fork

L7: Number of through lanes

L8: No through road for vehicles

L9: Advance warning of a no through road for vehicles

L10: Advance warning of traffic information for the direction shown

L11: Information on panel applies only to the lane(s) indicated

L12: Information on panel applies only to the lane indicated (overhead)

L13: Road tunnel

L14: Hard shoulder

L15: Hard shoulder equipped with emergency telephone and fire extinguisher

L16: Emergency telephone

L17: Fire extinguisher

L18: Emergency telephone and fire extinguisher

L19: Nearest exit or second nearest exits in the directions and at the distances indicated on the sign

L20: Passing area on right-hand side of the road

L21: Passing area on left-hand side of the road

BB13: Road Barriers

L51: Bicycle street, cars are guests

L403: EU country border, Netherlands variant

== Temporary signage for construction and emergencies ==
Diversion announcement. Follow Route "F".

Follow the indicated direction.

Follow the indicated direction; this is the last sign of the diversion.

Announcement of diversion on motorway (U-route).

BW501: Follow the indicated direction (U-route 15). This sign is installed permanently, but only takes on meaning when a yellow announcement board is placed alongside it.

BW501e: Follow the indicated direction (U-route 15); this is the last sign of the diversion. This sign is installed permanently, but only takes on meaning when a yellow announcement board is placed alongside it.

== Bilingual signage ==
In Friesland, a significant initiative is underway to introduce bilingual road signs featuring both Dutch and Frisian, responding to longstanding efforts to promote and make the minority language more visible in the public sphere. This rollout, scheduled to begin in 2026 along provincial roads, follows the agreement between the national government and the province, which allocated €18 million for language preservation. Many existing signs will be updated with stickers rather than being fully replaced, with old signs finding potential new homes in other provinces to reduce waste.

G13: bilingual version: optional cycle path

C2f + OB705: standard, Dutch only version: "go back", indicating no entry towards wrong-way drivers.

C2f + OB705: bilingual version, generally placed at ramps of controlled-access roads.

BB01: bilingual version: exit sign of controlled-access roads.

OB54 (sub-panel): bilingual version: exception of bikes and mopeds, commonly seen with access control signs at one-way streets.

H01d: Bilingual place name

== Toll Road ==
The A24 (Blankenburgverbinding), which opened on 7 December 2024, is the first motorway in the Netherlands to implement electronic free-flow tolling (e-TOL) without traditional toll booths or barriers. The 4.2-kilometre route connects the A15 at Rozenburg with the A20 at Vlaardingen via two tunnels—the Maasdeltatunnel and Hollandtunnel—and was built to improve accessibility in the Rotterdam port region. Toll was introduced to finance the €1.168 billion construction cost, with charges of €1.51 for light vehicles and €9.13 for heavy vehicles, and the tolling is expected to continue for approximately 25 years until construction costs are recovered. The system relies on ANPR cameras, requiring drivers to pay online within 72 hours of their journey or via automatic registration, a method that initially led to some payment compliance challenges as road users adapted to the new system.

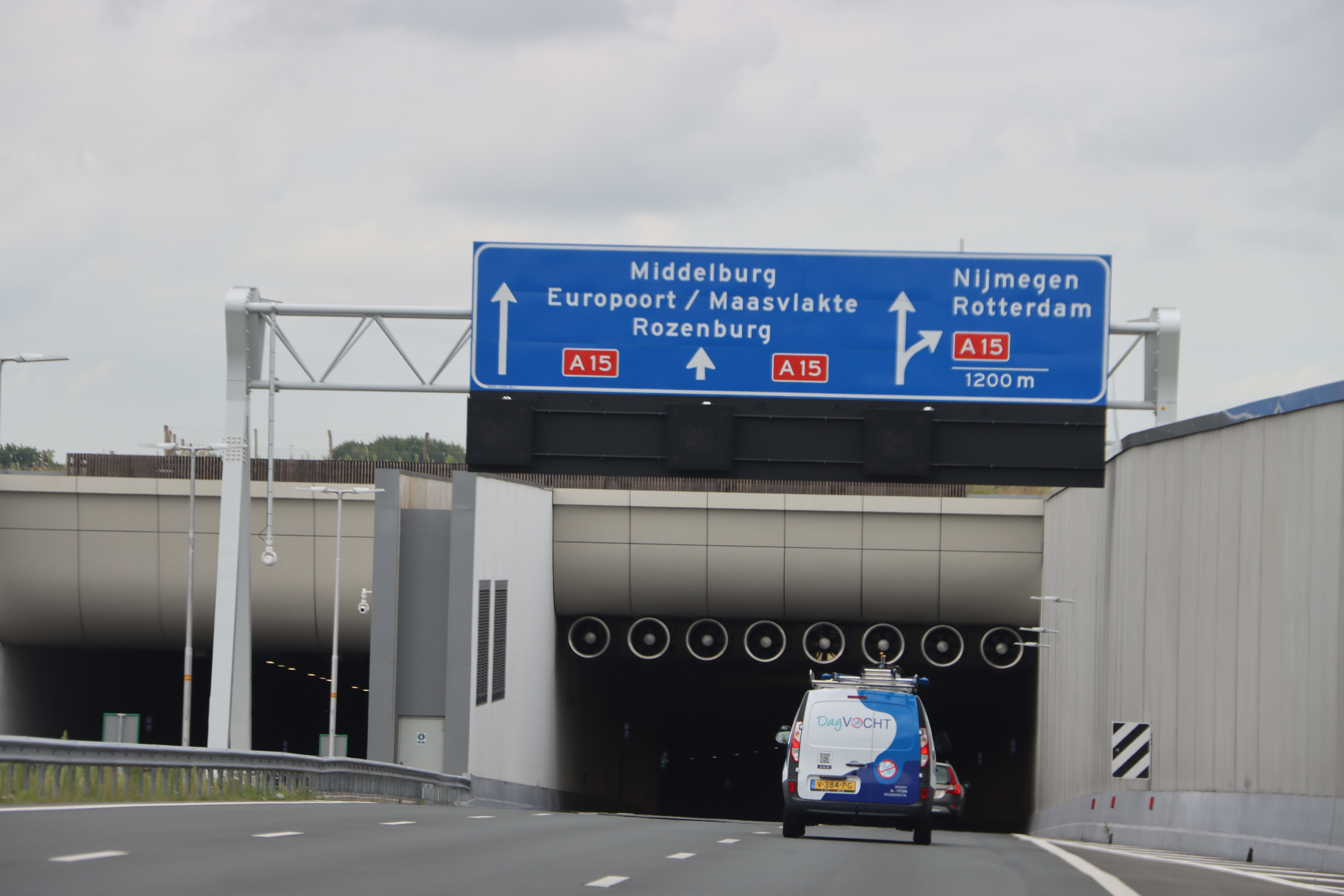
First toll road in the Netherlands

Announcement of automatic toll collection (e-TOL)

Online payment reminder

== Fatbike regulations ==
The explosive rise of fatbikes in the Netherlands can be directly linked to the introduction of a mandatory helmet law for light mopeds (snorfietsen) on 1 January 2023, which caused many young people to switch to fatbikes as an unregulated alternative. As a result, the number of recorded accidents involving teenagers on fatbikes exploded. In response, local municipalities took action: Enschede became the first Dutch city in July 2025 to ban fatbikes from its city centre, enforced via a local APV (General Local Regulation) during shopping hours. Amsterdam followed suit, introducing a ban on fatbikes with tyres wider than 7 centimeters in the Vondelpark starting 11 May 2026, with offenders facing a €115 fine. Finally, the Dutch cabinet announced on 24 April 2026 a national plan to introduce a minimum age and a helmet requirement for fatbikes, alongside granting municipalities the legal power to designate fatbike-free zones.

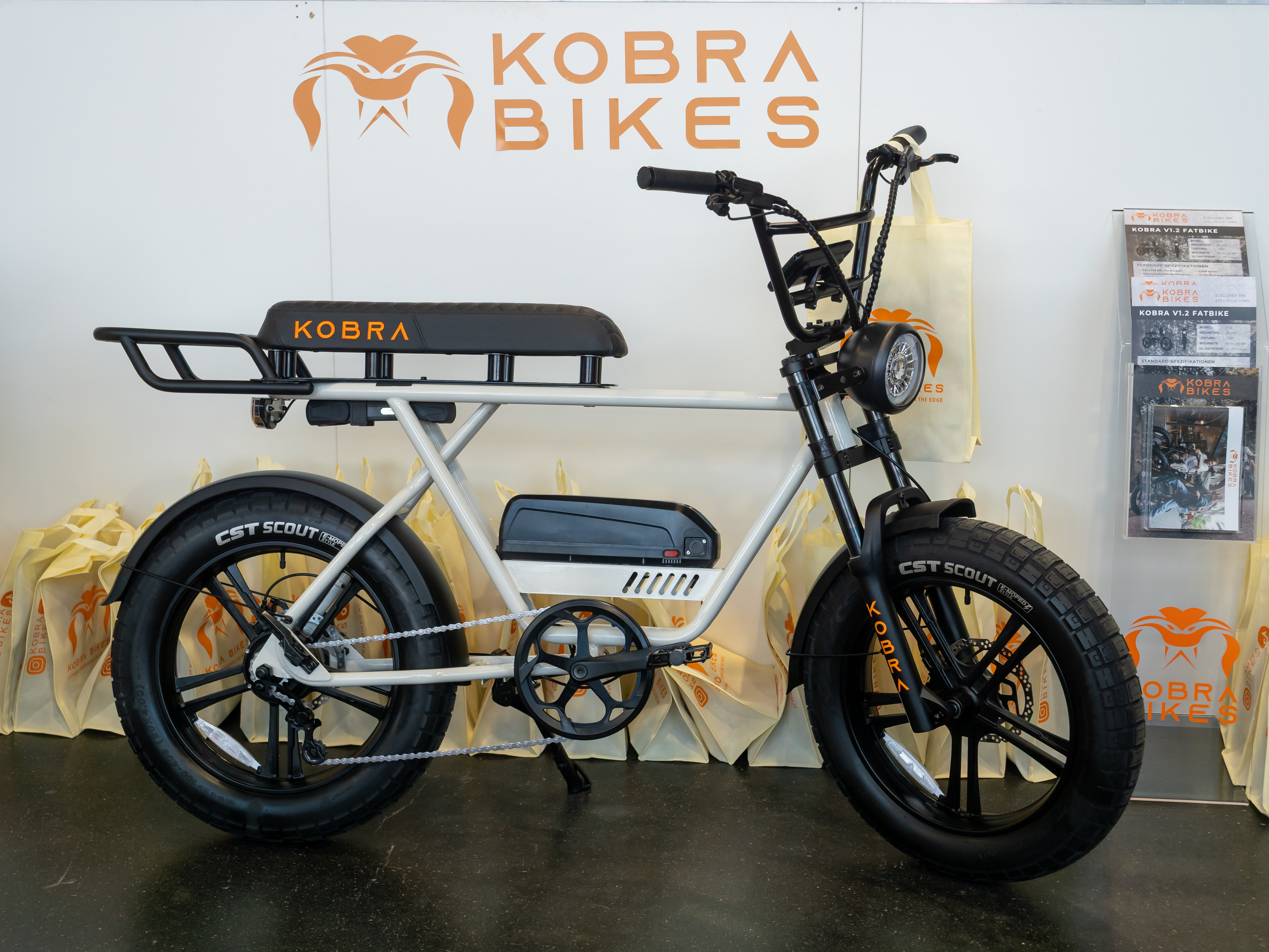
Common fatbike typology associated with traffic nuisance in the Netherlands

Amsterdam bans riding fatbikes in Vondelpark, enforced via local law

== Retired signs ==
=== 1935 - 1951 (design derived from Geneva Convention) ===
The signs are codified in 1941 by the Wegenverkeersregeling during occupation (see history section). It is the first formalised incorporation of the Geneva design in the Netherlands. The typeface is based on the German DIN standard, with slight modifications on the car pictogram and the shape of the arrow.

==== Warning signs ====
Danger

Tram crossing

Uneven road

Series of bends

Crossroad

Level crossing with barriers

Level crossing without barriers

Single crossbuck

Double crossbuck

==== Regulatory signs ====
No vehicles

Do not enter

No motor vehicles except motorcycles

No motorcycles

No bicycles

No horse-drawn carts

No handcarts

No livestock

No trailers

No motor vehicles

No motorcycles and bicycles

No motor vehicles and bicycles

No horse-drawn carts and handcarts

No horse-drawn carts, handcarts and livestock

Bicycle path

Mandatory direction

Vehicle width limit

Vehicle length limit

Class B road (no heavy and oversized vehicles)

Height limit

Speed limit

Speed limit ends

No stopping

No parking

No overtaking

No left turn

No right turn

Yield to oncoming traffic

Customs (in German border)

Customs (in Belgian border)

Yield

Stop

Highway

Taxi stand

==== Information signs ====
Parking

General caution (school)

First aid

Urban area begins

Urban area ends

Direction sign for highways

Direction sign

Direction sign for unpaved roads

Advance direction sign

Priority road

Priority road ends

Highway ends

Class B road ends (end of heavy and oversized vehicles ban)

Bicycle crossing

Priority over oncoming traffic

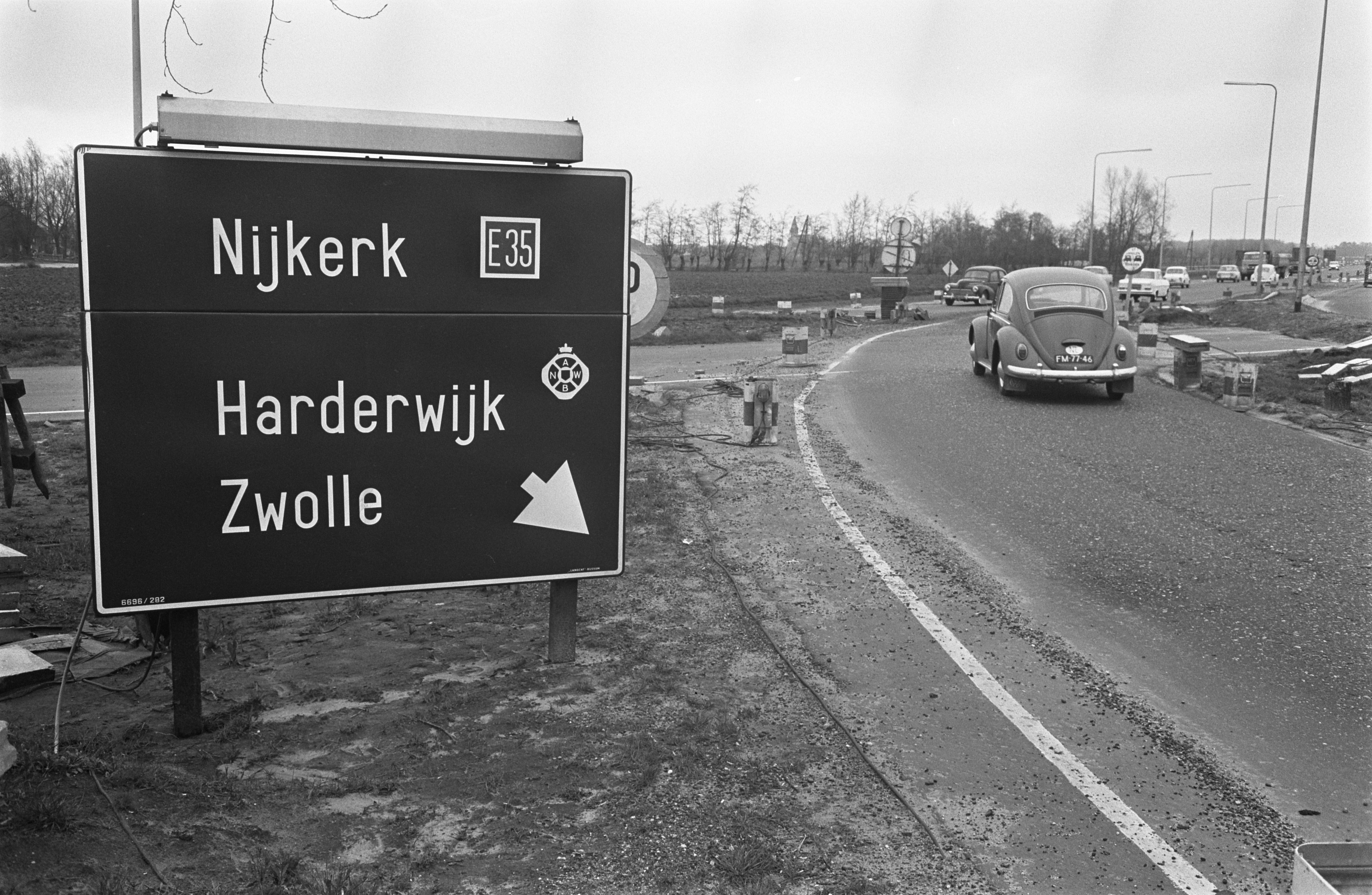
ANWB wayfinding sign with N26/27 typeface.

==== Rejected signs ====
These are road signs that existed as early as 1935 but were removed in 1941.

Weight limit

Vehicles dimension limit

No pedestrians

No horse-drawn carts, handcarts, pedestrians and livestock

No stopping and parking

=== 1951 - 1966 (clearer technical details) ===
The 1950 WVR follows the 1935 Wegenverkeerswet, with ratification delayed due to the war. This replaced the aforementioned 1941 WVR of the occupation government, which the Dutch government officially does not recognise. Most of the existing pictograms were refined and the board shape were rounded up and standardised across localities.

This section consists of various digitised signage:

==== Regulatory signs ====
7: Speed limit

8: Speed limit ends

9: Priority road

10: Yield

11: Stop

12: Priority road ends

13: No entry for all vehicular traffic

14: No entry

15: Mandatory direction

16: One-way traffic

18: No vehicles more than 3 wheels

19: No motorcycles

20: No bicycles

21: No vehicles more than 3 wheels and motorcycles

22: No Vehicles more than 3 wheels, bicycles, and mopeds

23: No motorcycles and bicycles

24: No trailers or vehicle add-ons

25: No animal-drawn carriages

26: No human-powered trolleys

27: No animal-drawn carriages and human-powered trolleys

28: Vehicle width limit

29: Vehicle length limit

30: Vehicle dimensions limit

31: Vehicle width limit

32: Vehicle length limit

33: Vehicle width and length limit

34: Height limit

35: No cattles/livestock

36: No animal-drawn carriages, human trolleys, and cattles

37: No pedestrians

38: No animal-drawn carriages, human trolleys, cattles, and pedestrians

39: Highway

40: Bicycle path

44: No left turn

45: No right turn

46: No overtaking

47: Yield to oncoming traffic

48: Priority over oncoming traffic

49: No stopping

55: No parking

67: Class B road (no heavy and oversized vehicles)

68: Class B road ends (end of heavy and oversized vehicles ban)

70: Axle load limit

71: Weight limit

==== Warning signs ====
90: Uneven surface

91: Series of curves

92: Crossroad

93: Level crossing with barriers

94: Level crossing without barriers

95: Draw bridge

97: Tram crossing

98: Roadworks

99: Road narrows

100: Slippery surface

101: Children

102: Pedestrian crossing

103: Wild animals

104: Crossroad with priority

105: Danger

106a: Single crossbuck

106b: Double crossbuck

==== Information signs ====
112: Customs

114: Taxi stand

115: Parking

116: Bicycle crossing

117: First aid

118: Hospital

119: Repair service

120: Telephone

121: Gas station

=== 1966 - 1990 (streamlined RVV overhaul) ===
The RVV replaced WVR in 1966, pictograms are modernised and simplified to reflect up-to-date vehicle typologies, ANWB typeface (derived from the American BPR Highway Gothic) are used alongside NEN3225:1970 standards developed by renowned Dutch typography expert Gerrit Willem Ovink.

==== Priority ====
1: Speed limit

1a: Recommended speed limit

2: Speed limit ends

2a: Recommended speed limit ends

6: Priority road

7: End of priority road

8a: Crossroad with priority

8b: Crossroad with priority (on left side road)

8c: Crossroad with priority (on right side road)

9: Give way to traffic on the main road ahead

10: Stop: Give way to traffic on the main road ahead (replaced by octagon design in 1980)

==== Prohibition and mandatory ====
11: No vehicles

12: No entry

13: One-way traffic

14: Mandatory direction

15: Roundabout

17: No access for vehicles with more than two wheels

17a: No access for goods vehicles

17b: No access for motor vehicles that cannot exceed 25 km/h

18: No trailers

19: No motorcycles

20: No motorised vehicles

21: No mopeds

22: No bicycles

23: No mopeds and bicycles

25: No man-powered carriages

26: No cattle-drawn carriages and man-powered trolleys

27: No pedestrians

28: No cattles

29: No pedestrians and cattles

30: No cattle- or man-powered carriages and cattles

31: No cattle- or man-powered carriages, pedestrians, and cattles

32: Length limit

33: Width limit

34: Height limit

35: Axle load limit

36: Weight limit

40: No overtaking

41: No overtaking ends

42: No overtaking by trucks

43: No overtaking by trucks ends

44: Give way to oncoming vehicles

45: Priority over oncoming vehicles

46a: No right turns

46b: No left turn

47: No turns

48: No U-turns

49: No parking

51: No stopping

52: No parrking for bicycles and mopeds

55: All restrictions ends

56: Customs

==== Special regulations ====
57a: Motorway

57b: Limited-access road

57c: Residential yard

58a: Motorway ends

58b: Limited-access road ends

58c: Residential yard ends

59: Bicycle path

60: Optional bicycle path

61: Footpath

==== Warning ====
65: Uneven road

65a: Low ground clearance

66: Bend to right

67: Bend to left

68: Double bend, first to right

69: Double bend, first to left

70: Steep hill downward

71: Dangerous crossing

72: Level crossing with barriers

73: Level crossing without barriers

75: Single crossbuck

76: Double crossbuck

77: Tram crossing

79: Draw bridge

80: Road work / Construction

81a: Road narrows (Both sides)

81b: Road narrows (Right side)

81c: Road narrows (Left side)

81d: Narrow marker

82: Slippery surface

83: School / children crossing

84a: Pedestrian crossing

84b: Zebra crossing

85: Loose surface

86: Quay or riverbank

87: Bicycle crossing

88: Wild animals

89: Livestock

90: Danger

91: Two-way traffic

92: Low-flying planes

93: Cross wind

94: Traffic lights ahead

94a: Traffic congestion

94b: Accident

94c: Poor visibility during weather events

94d: Risk of ice or snow

==== Information ====
95: Bicycle crossing

96a: Pedestrian crossing

96b: Underpass

98: Route for the conveyance of hazardous materials

99: Parking

99a: Parking only for permit holders

101a: Dead end

112: Camping area

113: Rest stop

114: Carpool

=== 1990 onwards (current RVV) ===
Ovink's typeface was phased out for the RWS typeface (ANWB's successor; see history section). Most signs are still in use except:

Environmental zone signs were introduced in 2022, however only three years later in 2025, the Dutch government announced that the text-based version is being replaced by pictogram-based version by 01 July 2026 to closer align with corresponding international design trends. Municipalities across the Netherlands are replacing those older signs, however installation delays are causing enforcement issues.

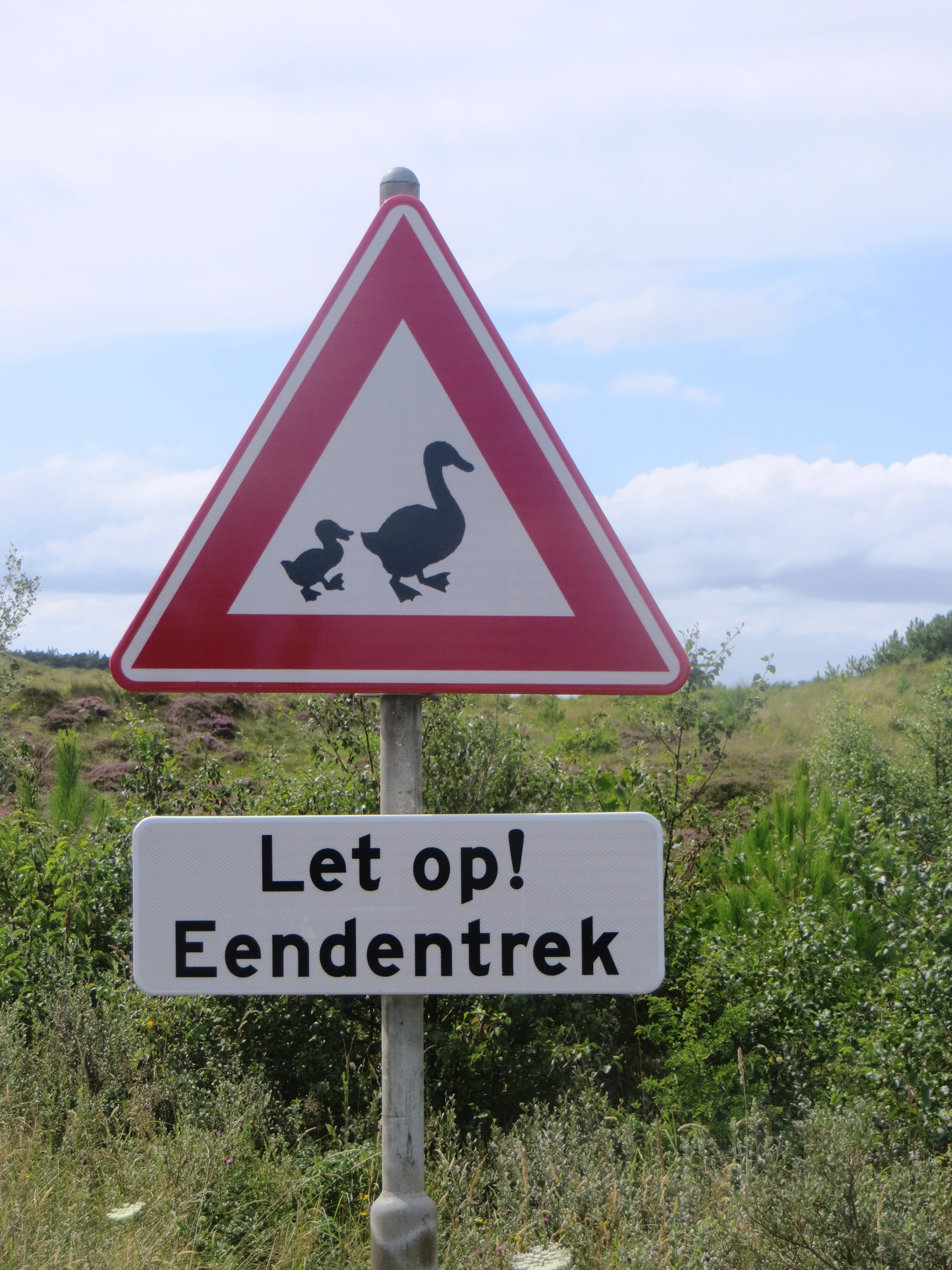
Duck crossing warning signs

C22a: Environmental zone: no access for vehicles not compliant with article 86d of RVV 1990 (replaced by C22e)

C22b: End of environmental zone (replaced by C22f)

== Influences ==
Suriname—as a former Dutch colony—base their signage designs on those used in the Netherlands (RVV 1990). However, some pictograms are mirrored horizontally to accommodate their left-hand traffic system.
