= Klaus-Dieter Lehmann =

German librarian (born 1940)

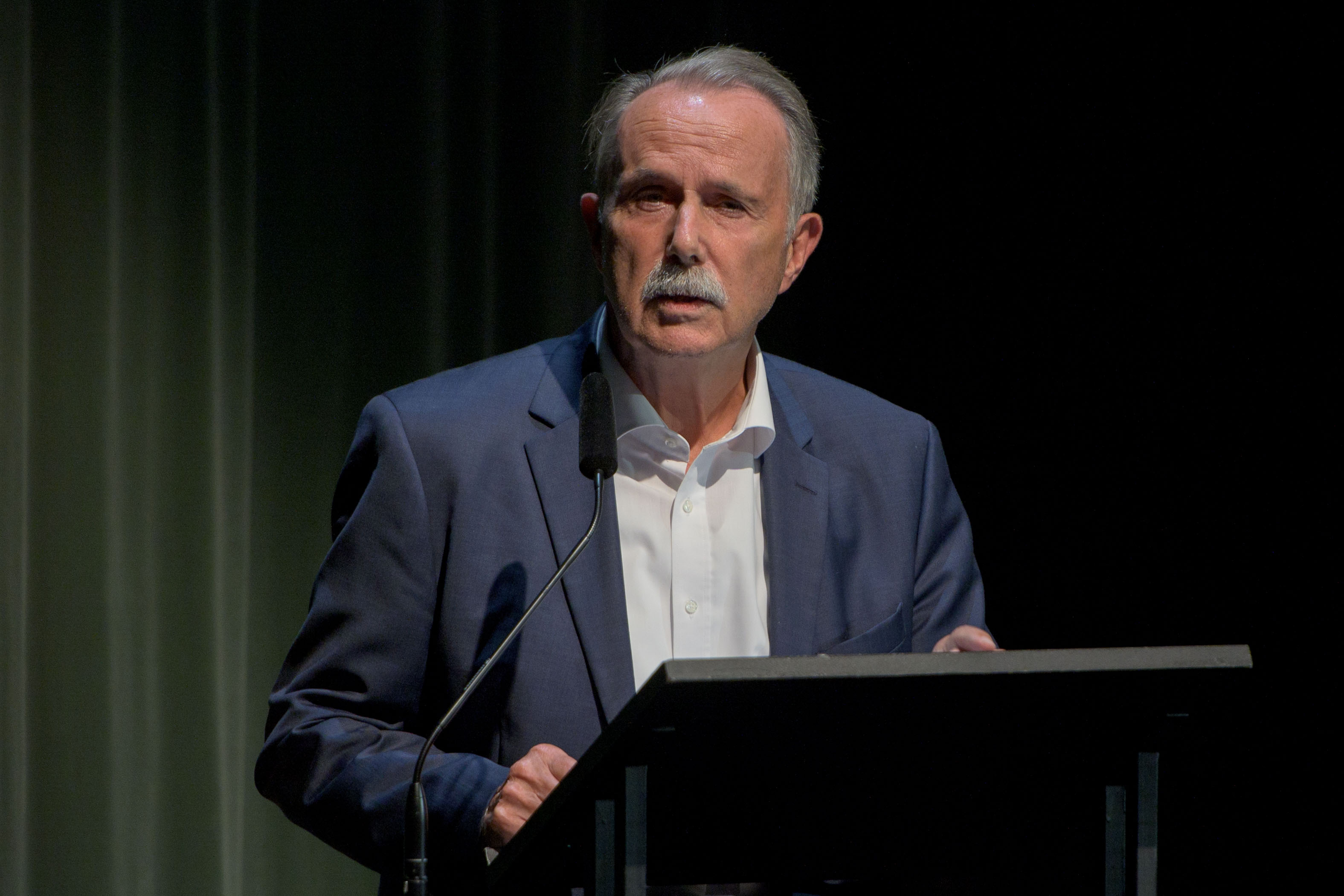
- Lehmann in 2019
- Born: 29 February 1940 (age 86); Breslau, Lower Silesia, Prussia, Nazi Germany
- Occupation: Librarian
- Awards: Gutenberg Prize of the International Gutenberg Society and the City of Mainz (2016)

Klaus-Dieter Lehmann (pronounced [klaʊs ˈdiːtɐ ˈleːman]; born 29 February 1940) is a German librarian and has been president of the Goethe-Institut (2008-2020).

== Career ==
Born in 1940 in Breslau, Lehmann studied physics and mathematics and passed his state examination in library science.

In 1988 Lehmann became director of the Deutsche Bibliothek, Frankfurt, the national library of West Germany. Following German reunification he merged the library with its East German counterpart in Leipzig; since 2006, the institution has been known as the German National Library. From 1998 to 2008 he served as president of the Prussian Cultural Heritage Foundation.

== Other activities ==
=== Corporate boards ===
- Deutsche Bank, member of the advisory board (since 2006)
- Holtzbrinck Publishing Group, member of the supervisory board

=== Non-profits ===
- Association of Arts and Culture of the German Economy at the Federation of German Industries (BDI), member of the Jury for the 2017 Arts Sponsorship Award
- Bavarian State Library (BSB), member of the board of trustees
- Bertelsmann Stiftung, member of the board of trustees (2005–2010)
- BHF Bank Foundation, member of the board of trustees
- Culture Foundation of the German Football Association (DFB), member of the board of trustees
- Deutsches Museum, member of the governing board
- German Academic Exchange Service (DAAD), member of the executive committee
- Germanisches Nationalmuseum, chairman of the administrative board
- German Book Prize Academy, member of the executive board
- German-Russian Forum, member of the board of trustees
- Museum Berggruen, member of the international council
- Opera Village Africa, member of the Circle of Friends
- Villa Stuck, member of the board of trustees
- German Academy for Language and Literature, member of the board of trustees
- German Federal Cultural Foundation, chairman of the advisory committee
- Giesecke & Devrient Foundation, member of the board of trustees
- Heinz Friedrich Foundation, member of the board of trustees
- Peace Prize of the German Book Trade, member of the board of trustees (2008–2014)
- Cultural Foundation of the Federal States, deputy chairman of the board of trustees
- Stifterverband für die Deutsche Wissenschaft, member of the board of trustees
- Ursula Lübbe Foundation, member of the board of trustees
- 2011 FIFA Women's World Cup, member of the board of trustees (2008–2011)
- Bertelsmann Foundation, member of the board of trustees (2006–2010)

== Recognition ==
Lehmann was awarded the Federal Cross of Merit, First Class, in 1996. In 2016, he was awarded the Gutenberg Prize of the International Gutenberg Society and the City of Mainz.
