= Mahendra Patel (typeface designer) =

Indian typeface designer and teacher (born 1943)

Mahendra Patel, born February 21 1943, is an Indian typeface designer and teacher. He studied from 1960-64 at the University of Baroda Faculty of Fine Arts, where he majored in fine arts painting under K. G. Subramanyan, and at the National Institute of Design (NID) in Ahmedabad. At NID, Patel was trained by swiss graphic designer Armin Hofmann during one year, in 1965. He attended the Advanced Program for Graphic Design at Schule für Gestaltung Basel, Switzerland, in 1968. In 1971, he worked for one year with Adrian Frutiger in Paris.

In 2010 he was awarded the Gutenberg Prize of the International Gutenberg Society and the City of Mainz for his contribution to typography.
