= Chansonnier Cordiforme =

15th-century heart-shaped music manuscript

Chansonnier cordiforme
- Paris, Bibliothèque nationale, Ms. Rothschild 2973
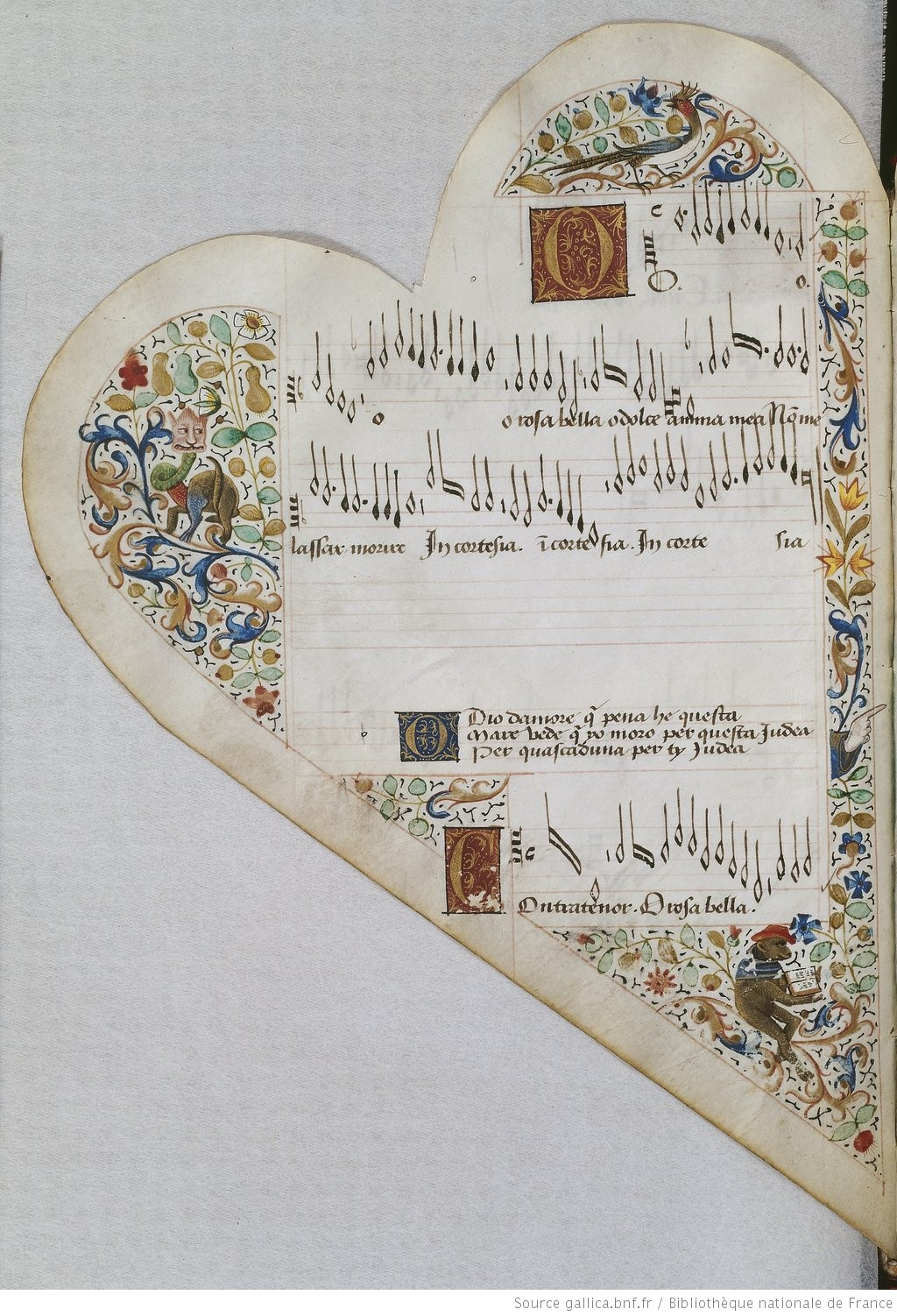
- Paris, BnF, Ms. Rothschild 2973 f. 8v: O rosa bella by John Bedyngham
- Also known as: Chansonnier de Jean de Montchenu
- Type: Chansonnier
- Date: c.1475
- Place of origin: France, Savoy
- Language: French
- Patron: Jean de Montchenu, Bishop of Agen then of Viviers
- Material: Parchment, ink, tempera, gold
- Size: 72 ff.; codex: 22×16 cm, leaves: 18.5×16 cm
- Format: Cordiform
- Contents: Music
- Illumination(s): 2 miniatures, 254 illuminated initials; foliate borders with grotesques, all in colours and gold

The Chansonnier Cordiforme (1470s), or Chansonnier de Jean de Montchenu, is a cordiform (heart-shaped) music manuscript, Collection Henri de Rothschild MS 2973, held in the Bibliothèque Nationale, Paris, France.

The manuscript was commissioned in Savoy between 1460 and 1477 by canon Jean de Montchenu, later Bishop of Agen (1477) and Bishop of Vivier (1478–1497). An edition was prepared by Geneviève Thibault de Chambure in 1952, and the complete manuscript was recorded by Anthony Rooley and the Consort of Musicke.

== Songs ==
The chansonnier comprises 43 songs by Dufay, Binchois, Ockeghem, Busnoys and others including several unica.
