= Henri Friedlaender =

Israeli typographer and book designer

Henri Friedlaender הנרי פרידלנדר
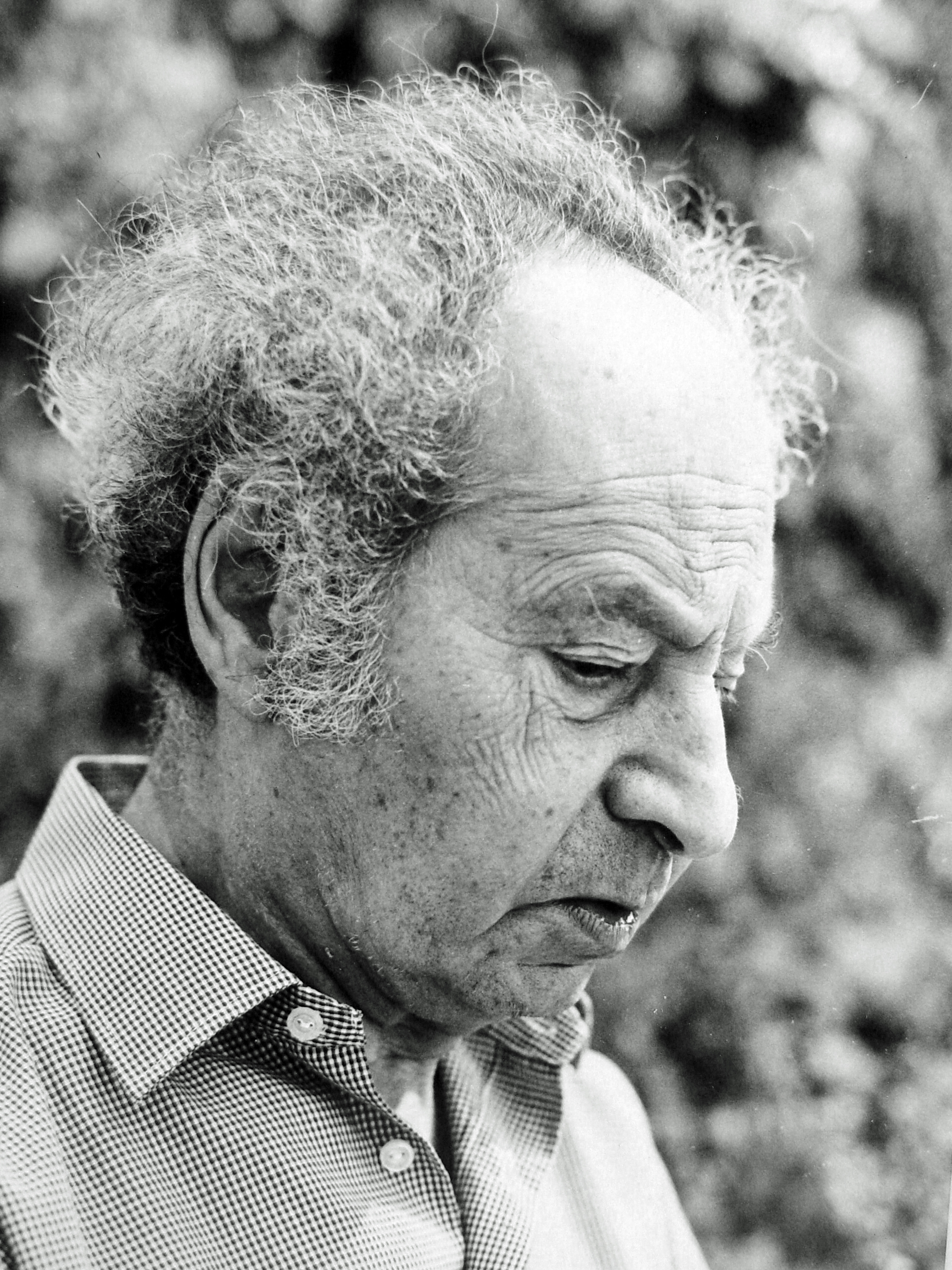
- Henri Friedlaender (~1975)
- Born: 15 March 1904; Lyon, France
- Died: 15 November 1996 (aged 92); Jerusalem, Israel
- Known for: Typographer; Graphic designer

Henri Friedlaender (Hebrew: הנרי פרידלנדר; 1904–1996) was an Israeli typographer and book designer. He co-founded the Hadassah Printing School and served as the first director of the school.

== Early life ==
He was born in Lyon, France, in 1904 to a British mother, Rose Calmann and a German-Jewish father, Théodore Friedlaender, who was a silk merchant. His sister was the ceramic artist Marguerite Wildenhain. When he was six years old the family moved to Berlin where he attended the Mommsen-Gymnasium. In 1925, he moved to Leipzig, where he studied calligraphy and printing in Leipzig Academy of Graphic Arts.

== Career and personal life ==
Friedlaender examines Hadassah Hebrew typeface sketches. The sequence was shot in his study in Motza Illit in 1978

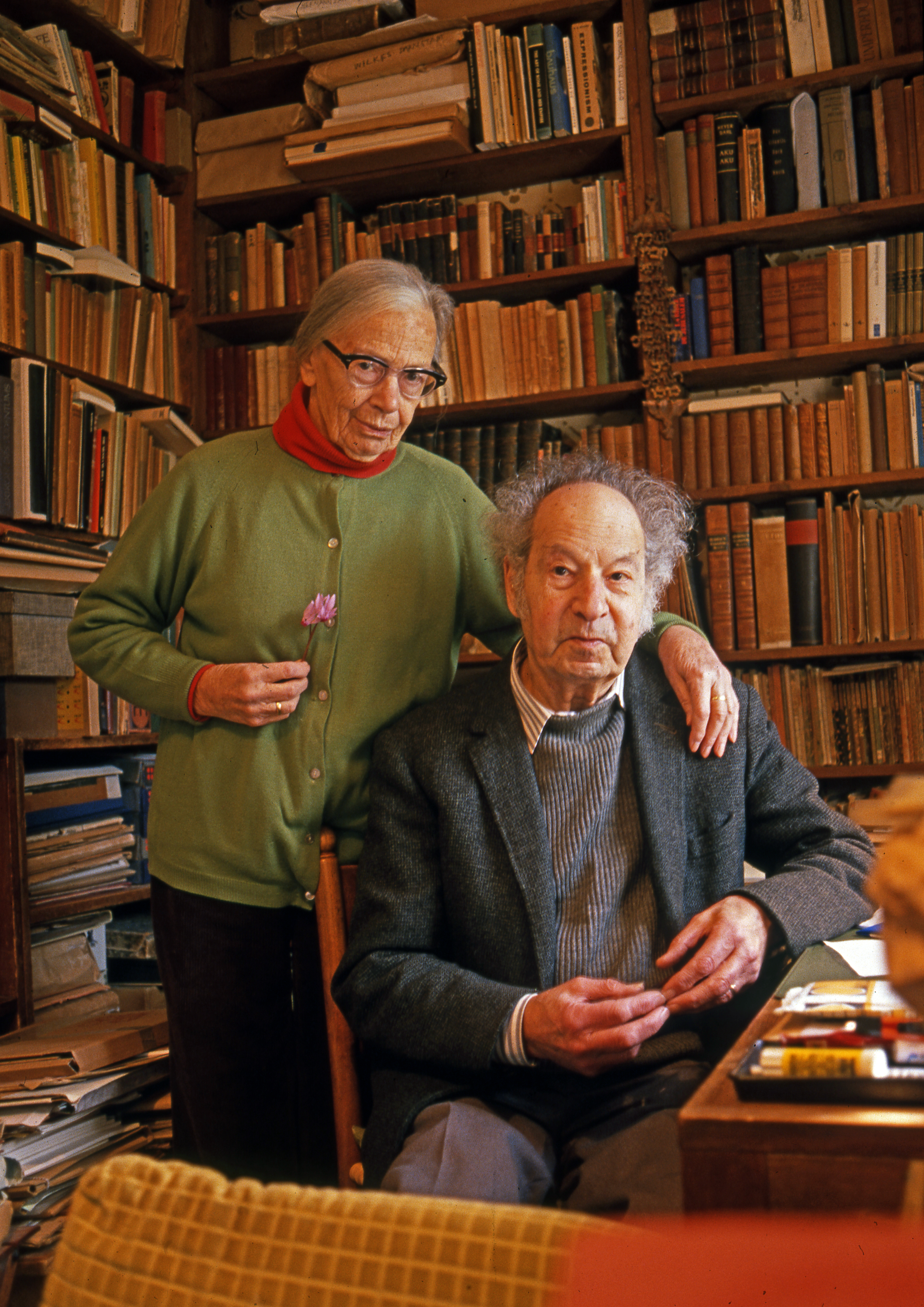
Henri Friedlaender and his wife Maria, in his study in Motza Illit, Israel (1989)

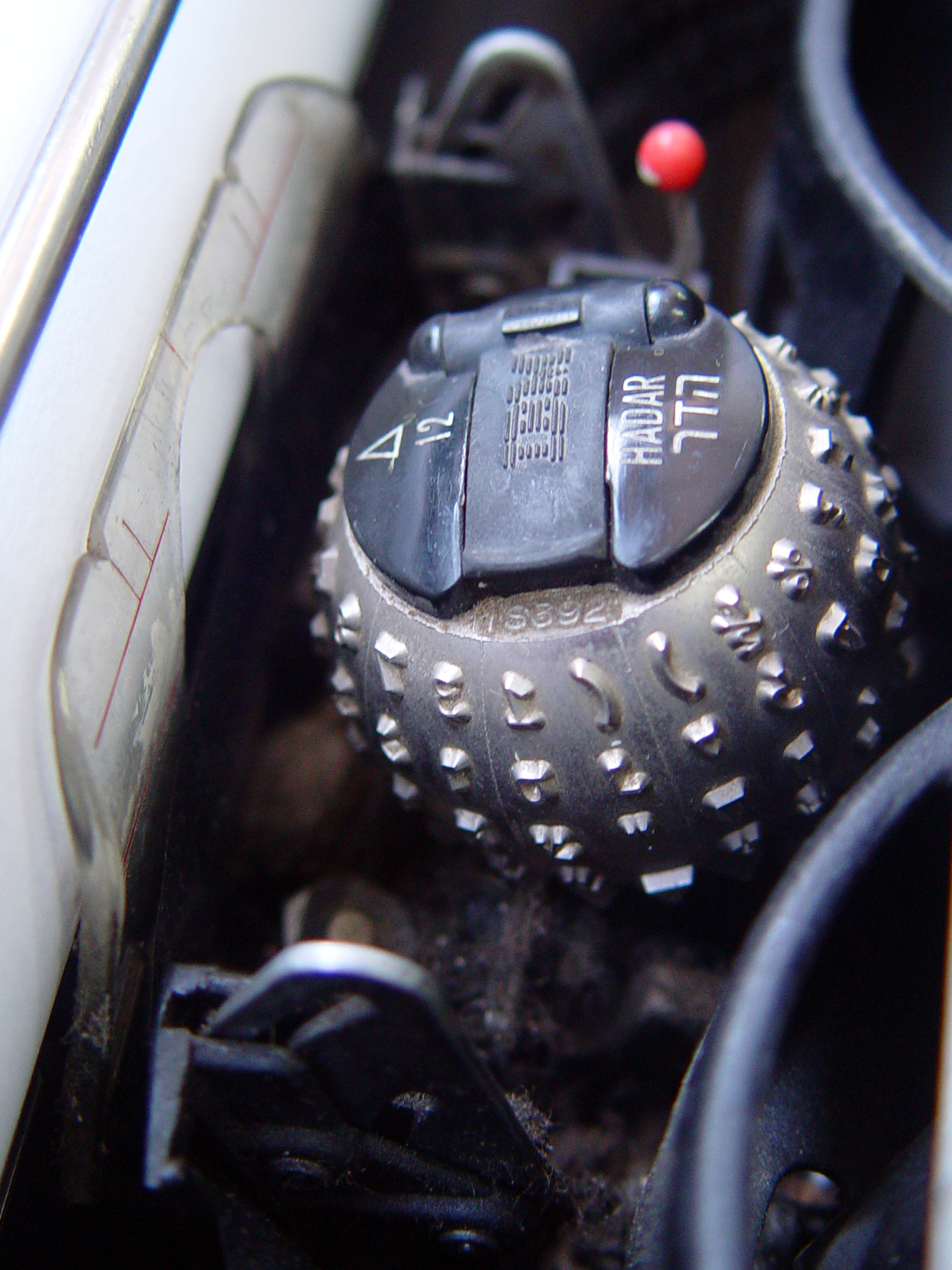
IBM Selectric II dual Latin/Hebrew Hadar typeball, designed by Friedlaender

In 1930, Friedlaender started working on the Hebrew typeface Hadassah in Germany. He later worked with B. G. Teubner and with Wirth in Dresden, with Jakob Hegner in Hellerau, and for the Klingspor Type Foundry with Max Dorn. After working with Rudolf Koch he became a typographic designer with Hartung in Hamburg and later a printer and manager with Haag-Drugulin in Leipzig with Ernst Kellner. In 1932, Friedlaender immigrated to the Netherlands where he worked as art director of Drukkerij Mouton & Co. in The Hague. In 1940 Friedlaender married Maria Helena Bruhn, a gymnastics teacher. Due to the Nazi occupation restrictions he had to stop his professional activities and hide in the attic of his house in Wassenaar. Between 1940 and 1945 he was totally isolated, communicating only with his wife who, herself not being Jewish, could overtly make a living. In these years he continued to work for the Exilliteratur publishers Querido and Allert de Lange, and further designed the Hadassah typeface (completed in 1958).

In 1950, Friedlaender along with his wife and daughter immigrated to Israel, where he headed the Hadassah-Brandeis Apprentice School of Printing in Jerusalem. Retiring in 1970 he continued to work as a book designer and teacher, and designed three Hebrew typefaces for the IBM Selectric typewriter II typeball (Shalom, Hadar, Aviv). Henri Friedlaender received the Gutenberg Prize of the International Gutenberg Society and the City of Mainz in 1971.

Friedlaender died in Motza Illit (near Jerusalem) at the age of 92, in 1996 and his wife died in 1994, at the age of 90.

== Prizes and awards ==
- 1937 - Silver medal: Exposition Internationale des Arts et Techniques dans la Vie Moderne
- 1950 - Buchpreis (Duwaer-Prijs) der Stadt Amsterdam
- 1954 - La Triennale di Milano
- 1959 - Internationale Buchkunst Ausstellung in Leipzig
- 1971 - Gutenberg Prize.

== Solo exhibitions ==
- Israel Museum - 1973
- Tel Aviv Museum of Art - 1985

== Writings by ==
- Die Vorbilder der Mediäval und der Antiqua, Archiv für Buchgewerbe und Gebrauchsgraphik, Leipzig: Deutsche Buchgewerbeverein., 1927, 10/12, pp. 726–730
- Die Buchbinderinnen Dorothea und Katharina Freise, Archiv für Buchgewerbe und Gebrauchsgraphik, Leipzig: Deutsche Buchgewerbeverein., May 1932, pp. 227–232
- Moderne holländische Druckschriften, Schweizer Graphische Mitteilungen (journal), to 1951. See also Typographische Monatsblätter. Aug. 1948, pp. 336–339 (brief Eng. summary pp. 359, 361)
- Philobiblon, 1933, p. 1 (self-advertisement)
- Typografisch ABC, Den Haag, 1939 (written for apprentices at Mouton) (Dutch)
- De Overweldiger. Hoofdstuk I en II van het boek Habakuk vertaald door Henri Friedlaender (1945) (Dutch)
- Zijn einde. Jesaja XIV: 3-21 vertaald door Henri Friedlaender (1945) (Dutch)
- Der Knecht Gottes, (introduction + commentary) Pulvis Viarum (1947) (German)
- Hoe bereikt men aesthetisch verantwoord zetsel op de zetmachine?, Kerstnummer Drukkersweekblad, Winter 1948 (Dutch)
- Typographie oder Gebrauchsgraphik?, Schweizer Graphische Mitteilungen (journal), to 1951. See also Typographische Monatsblätter, June 1948, pp. 257–264 (German)
- Toward a Modern Hebrew. Printing & Graphic Arts. February(1959): 49–56.
- Modern Hebrew Typefaces. Typographica. 16(1959): 4–9.
- The history of numerals. Typographica. 1(1960): 48–53.
- On Letters and Digits. Hadassah Printing School, Jerusalem, 1960. (Hebrew)
- Book Craft. Hadassah Printing School, Jerusalem, 1962. (Hebrew)
- Modern Hebrew lettering. Ariel: A quarterly review of the arts and sciences in Israel. 4(1962): 6–15. Print. Jan./Feb.(1964): 81. (Typography – USA seminar).
- Training by production. Penrose Annual. (1965): 167–173.
- Die Entstehung meiner Hadassah-Hebräisch, Hamburg: Sichowsky/Christians, 1967. (translated into English: The Making of Hadassah Hebrew. The Typophiles Keepsake. 1975. Israel Bibliophiles newsletter. 4(1984): 1–4.).
- Von dem Möglichkeiten und den Notwendigkeiten künftiger Buchgestaltung (HF as participant in a symposium with Jan Tschichold and others), Hamburg: Sichowsky/Christians, 1970 (German).
- Dankwort - Gutenberg Preis, Gutenberg Gesellschaft, Mainz (1971) (German)
- Contribution to Richard von Sichowsky, Typograph, 1985
- Color Theory for Printers, 1994 (Hebrew)

== Writings about ==
- Henri Friedlaender: Typography and Lettering, Jerusalem: Israel Museum. Library Hall. February–March, 1973. Cat. no. 105.
- Henri Friedlaender: Gutenberg Prize Winner. Israel Book World. 5(September 1971): 9–11.
- Wer ist wer? Schweizer Graphische Mitteilungen (journal), to 1951. See also Typographische Monatsblätter. July(1949): 321.
- Allgemeines Künstlerlexikon, Munich/Leipzig: K.G. Saur Verlag, 1990-., 2005.
- Avrin, Leila. The art of the Hebrew book in the twentieth century. In [49], pages 125–139.
- Blumenthal, Joseph. Typographic Years: a Printer's Journey Through a Half Century 1925-1975. New York: Frederic C. Beil, 1982.
- Broos, Kees, and Hefting, Paul. Dutch Graphic Design. London: Phaidon, 1993, pp. 126, 127, 146.
- Fischer, Ernst and others, Buchgestaltung im Exil 1933–1950. Eine Ausstellung des Deutschen Exilarchivs 1933–1945 Der Deutschen Bibliothek. Wiesbaden: Harrassowitz Verlag, 2003. pp. 38, 40, 95, and biog. pp. 160–161
- Fontaine, William C. The Hadassah type at Dartmouth's Graphic Arts Workshop in Baker Library. on The Hadassah Type at Dartmouth's Graphic Arts Workshop in Baker Library
- Friedl, Friedrich. Ott, Nicolaus. Stein, Bernard. Typography – when/who/how. Cologne: Könemann Verlagsgesellschaft mbH. 1998, 1998.
- Halbey Hans A. (Ed.) Henri Friedlaender, in Scriptura, Harenberg Edition, 1990 ISBN 3-88379-599-2
- Heynemann, Susanne. Henri Friedlaender, in Jelle Kingma (ed.), Susanne Heynemann, Typografe (exh. cat.), Den Hague: Museum van het Boek/Museum Meermanno-Westreenianum, 1998
- Keim, Anton Maria. Gutenberg-Preis. Preisträger 1971: www.gutenberg-gesellschaft.uni-mainz.de.
- Keim, M. Der Gutenberg-Preis: eine internationale Botschaft aus der Medienstadt Mainz seit 1968. Gutenberg-Gesellschaft, Mainz 1998.
- Löb, Kurt. Drei deutschsprachige graphische Gestalter als Emigranten in Holland. Philobiblon, Sept. 1989, pp. 177–207 (includes Paul Urban)
- Löb, Kurt. Die Buchgestaltungen Henri Friedlaenders für die Amsterdamer Exil-Verlage Querido und Allert de Lange 1933–1940. Philobiblon, September 1990, pp. 207–217
- Löb, Kurt. Exil-Gestalten. Deutsche Buchgestalter in den Niederlanden 1932–1950, Arnhem: Gouda Quint, 1995 (the work of Friedlaender and Paul Urban biographies, bibliographies see esp. p. 108)
- Löb, Kurt. Grafici in ballingschap: Henri Friedlaender en Paul Urban, Duitse grafisch vormgevers in het Nederlandse exil 1932–1950. Amsterdam: Universiteitsbibliotheek Amsterdam, 1997. (Catalog of an exhibition held at the University Library Amsterdam, March 21 - May 16, 1997.)
- Lubell, Stephen. Henri Friedlaender - In Memoriam, Gutenberg Jahrbuch, 1997, pp. 348–349
- Ovink, G.W. Die Gesinnung des Typografen (speeches by Ovink and Friedlaender at the Gutenberg Prize presentation, 1971), Mainz: Gutenberg-Gesellschaft, 1973 + Gutenberg Jahrbuch, 1984, pp. 14–17
- Ranc, Robert. Henri Friedlaender. Arts et techniques graphiques. 85(1972): 3-26.
- Remy, W. Henri Friedlaender und das Hohelied. Illustration. 63(August 1984): 42–55.
- Soifer, I. Henri Friedlaender: Book designer. Ariel: A Quarterly Review of Arts and Letters in Israel. Jerusalem. 33-4(1973): 131–148.
- Soifer, Israel. Henri Friedlaender: New Approach to Type. Publishers' Weekly. (1 July 1968):74-75.
- Standard, Paul. Henri Friedlaender: A Koch Pupil Who Brings His Master's Reflective Spirit to the Dutch Book Arts. Print: A Quarterly Journal of the Graphic Arts. 2(1947): 15–27.
- Stern, Gideon. Printing, Books and Gideon Stern, Jerusalem: Israel Academy of Sciences and Humanities, 2004
- Tamari, I.J. Kusari-Hebräisch – der Anfang einer Druckschrift von Henri Friedlaender und Paul Koch, Gutenberg Jahrbuch, 1992, pp. 309–318
- Tamari, I.J. Nachruf auf Henri Friedlaender (obituary), Wolfenbütteler Notizen zur Buchgeschichte, Jg. 22, H. 1 (?1997)
- Zahler, Ernst. Über das niederländische Buchschaffen, Schweizer Graphische Mitteilungen (journal), to 1951. See also Typographische Monatsblätter. Feb. 1949, pp. 85–92
