= Mahendra Patel (engineer) =

Mahendra Patel is an electrical engineer at the Electric Power Research Institute in Palo Alto, California. He was named a Fellow of the Institute of Electrical and Electronics Engineers (IEEE) in 2016 for his contributions to synchrophasors standardization.
