= Road signs in Belgium =

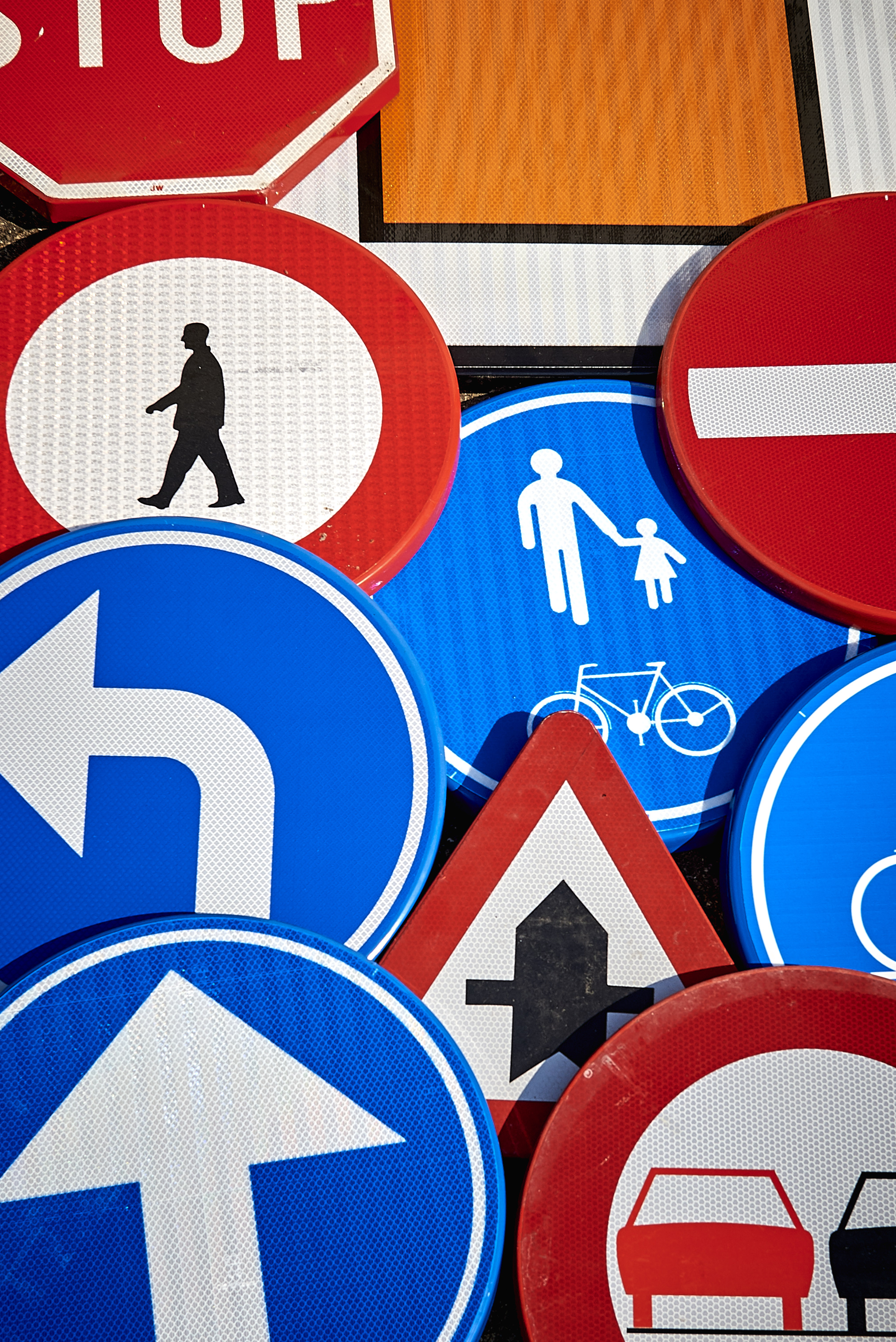
Collection of Belgian road signs

Road signs in Belgium are defined in the Royal Decree of 1 December 1975 on general regulations for the road traffic police and in the use of public highways (Dutch: Wegcode or French: Code de la route). They generally conform to the 1968 Vienna Convention on Road Signs and Signals, to which Belgium is a signatory. The official typeface on road signs in Belgium is SNV, with Helvetica Medium Italic used for tourist destinations, points of interest, or public institutions.

== History ==
=== Early foundations (ca. 1880 - 1960s) ===
Prior to World War II, Belgian road signs were managed by hobbyists and tour clubs, similar to their northern neighbour, the Netherlands. Before formal state intervention, the Royal Automobile Club of Belgium (RACB) and Touring Club Belgium (TCB) served as the primary custodians of wayfinding infrastructure, deploying localised cast-iron signposts at major intersections.

The first formalisation effort occurred with the Royal Decree of 1926, which established national road guidelines to align with the Paris International Convention Relative to Motor Traffic. Following Belgium's active participation in the 1931 Geneva Convention concerning the Unification of Road Signals, these guidelines were updated to adopt international standards. During this interwar era, early Belgian warning signs mirrored French design conventions, featuring dark blue or black backplates with white embossed iconography.

The post-war economic boom and rapid domestic motorisation forced Belgium to unify its disparate traffic laws under a centralised national framework. This resulted in the landmark Royal Decree of 14 March 1954, which established the nation's first truly cohesive Traffic Code (Wegcode or Code de la route). Warning signs featured a high-contrast yellow background with a red border—a layout influenced by the international Geneva protocols of 1949 and post-war French standards, which phased out older interwar designs.

=== Adopting international standards (1960s - 70s) ===
Belgium signed the United Nations Vienna Convention on Road Signs and Signals on 8 November 1968, and formally ratified it on 16 November 1988. The signing of the treaty directly influenced the landmark Royal Decree of 1 December 1975, which established the classic alphanumeric signage system (Series A through F) that remained the national standard for over fifty years. This era was visually defined by the heavy deployment of internally illuminated highway signboxes.

Following the second and third state reforms in the 1980s, Belgium transitioned into a federal state. Competence over public works, road infrastructure, and traffic sign placement was devolved from the national Ministry of Public Works to three regional administrative agencies: the Agentschap Wegen en Verkeer (AWV) in Flanders, the Service Public de Wallonie (SPW) in Wallonia, and Brussels Mobility in the Brussels-Capital Region.

=== 2020s overhaul ===
In 2021, French-speaking Wallonia updated its regional design manuals (Qualiroute) to phase out remaining fluorescent lightboxes in favour of passive, retroreflective signs. This transition was accelerated by the catastrophic European floods of July 2021, which decimated the infrastructure of Wallonia's Vesdre and Meuse valleys and necessitated the widespread, rapid replacement of thousands of destroyed signs.

On 3 June 2024, King Philippe and Federal Minister of Mobility Georges Gilkinet signed the Royal Decree establishing the Code of the Public Highway (French: Code de la voie publique, Dutch: Code van de openbare weg). This represented the first comprehensive structural and visual modernisation of Belgian pictograms layout elements since 1975. While originally slated to take effect on 1 September 2026, a modifying Royal Decree signed on 30 June 2026 officially postponed the entry into force to 1 June 2027. This delay was enacted to allow regional authorities in Brussels, Flanders, and Wallonia sufficient time to harmonise their respective regional traffic safety decrees and database registries with the new federal framework.

In 2026, Flemish-speaking Flanders updated its Handleiding verticale signalisatie (Vertical Signage Manual) to optimise motorway wayfinding and harmonise to their international neighbours. Lane-indicator arrows reflected the 2010s Dutch (Rijkswaterstaat) transition from downward-pointing to upward-pointing arrows, and exit signs adopted the standard European pictogram and referenced the French design layout. To address historical disputes regarding linguistic representation on signs, the regional guidelines conform strictly to the Coordinated Laws on Language Use in Administrative Matters of 18 July 1966. On regional roads, destination names are rendered in the endonym of the target municipality (e.g., Luik in Flanders, Liège in Wallonia), while Brussels utilises strictly bilingual, double-line layouts of equal typographic weight.

== Warning signs (1975-2027) ==
A1a: Bend to the left

A1b: Bend to the right

A1c: Double bend, first to the left

A1d: Double bend, first to the right

A3: Steep descent

A5: Steep ascent

A7a: Road narrows

A7b: Road narrows on the left

A7c: Road narrows on the right

A9: Opening bridge

A11: Quayside or riverbank

A13: Uneven road

A14: Road bump

A15: Slippery road

A17: Loose surface

A19: Falling roads

A21: Pedestrian crossing

A23: Children

A25: Cyclists

A27: Deer crossing

A29: Cattle crossing

A31: Roadworks

A33: Traffic signals

A35: Low-flying aircraft

A37: Crosswinds

A39: Two-way traffic

A41: Railroad crossing ahead with gates or barriers

A43: Railroad crossing ahead without gates or barriers

A45: Railroad crossing (single track)

A47: Railroad crossing (multiple tracks)

A49: Tramway crossing

A50: Traffic queues likely

A51: Other dangers

== Priority signs (1975-2027) ==
B1: Yield

B3: Yield in 150 metres

B5: Stop

B7: Stop in 150 metres

B9: Priority road

B11: End of priority road

B13: End of priority road in 250 metres

B15: Intersection with priority

B17: Intersection with priority to the right

B19: Yield to oncoming traffic

B21: Priority over oncoming traffic

B22: Bike may pass a yellow or red light to turn right, after yield

B23: Bike may pass a yellow or red light to go straight, after yield

== Prohibitory signs (1975-2027) ==
C1: Do not enter

C3: No vehicles in both directions

C5: No entry for motor vehicles with more than two wheels and motorcycles with sidecar

C7: No entry for motorcycles

C9: No entry for mopeds

C11: No entry for bicycles

C13: No entry for horse-drawn vehicles

C15: No entry for horse riders

C17: No entry for hand carts

C19: No entry for pedestrians

C21: Weight limit

C22: No entry for buses

C23: No entry for trucks

C24a: No entry for vehicles transporting dangerous goods

C24b: No entry for vehicles transporting flammable or explosive goods

C24c: No entry for vehicles transporting water polluting goods

C25: Length limit

C27: Width limit

C29: Height limit

C31a: No left turn

C31b: No right turn

C33: No U-turn

C35: No overtaking

C37: End of the overtaking restriction

C39: No overtaking for vehicles with a maximum allowed mass of over 3,5 tonnes

C41: End of the overtaking restriction for vehicles with a maximum allowed mass of over 3,5 tonnes

C43: Maximum speed

C45: End of the maximum speed restriction

C46: End of the restrictions imposed on moving vehicles

C47: Toll post

== Mandatory signs (1975-2027) ==
D1a: Ahead only

D1b: Turn left

D1b: Turn right

D1c: Pass on left

D1d: Pass on right

D1e: Turn left ahead

D1f: Turn right

D3a: Turn left or ahead only

D3b: Turn right or ahead only

D4: Direction of vehicles transporting dangerous goods (turn left)

D4: Direction of vehicles transporting dangerous goods (ahead only)

D4: Direction of vehicles transporting dangerous goods (turn right)

D5: Roundabout

D7: Cycleway

D9a: Segregated path for pedestrians and cyclists

D9b: Segregated path for pedestrians and cyclists

D10: Shared path for pedestrians and cyclists

D11: Footpath

D13: Bridlepath

== Parking signs (1975-2027) ==
E1: No parking

E3: No stopping

E5: No parking from the 1st till 15th day of the month

E7: No parking from the 16th till last day of the month

E9a: Parking permitted

E9a: Parking permitted, when using parking disk

E9a: Parking reserved for disabled people

E9b: Parking reserved for motorcycles, cars, vans (< 3.5t) and minibusses

E9c: Parking reserved for trucks

E9d: Parking reserved for coaches

E9e: Parking mandatory on the verge or sidewalk

E9f: Parking mandatory partly on the verge or sidewalk

E9g: Parking mandatory on the road

E9h: Parking reserved for campers

E9i: Parking reserved for motorcycles

E11: Half-monthly parking restriction in built-up areas

== Indicatory signs (1975-2027) ==
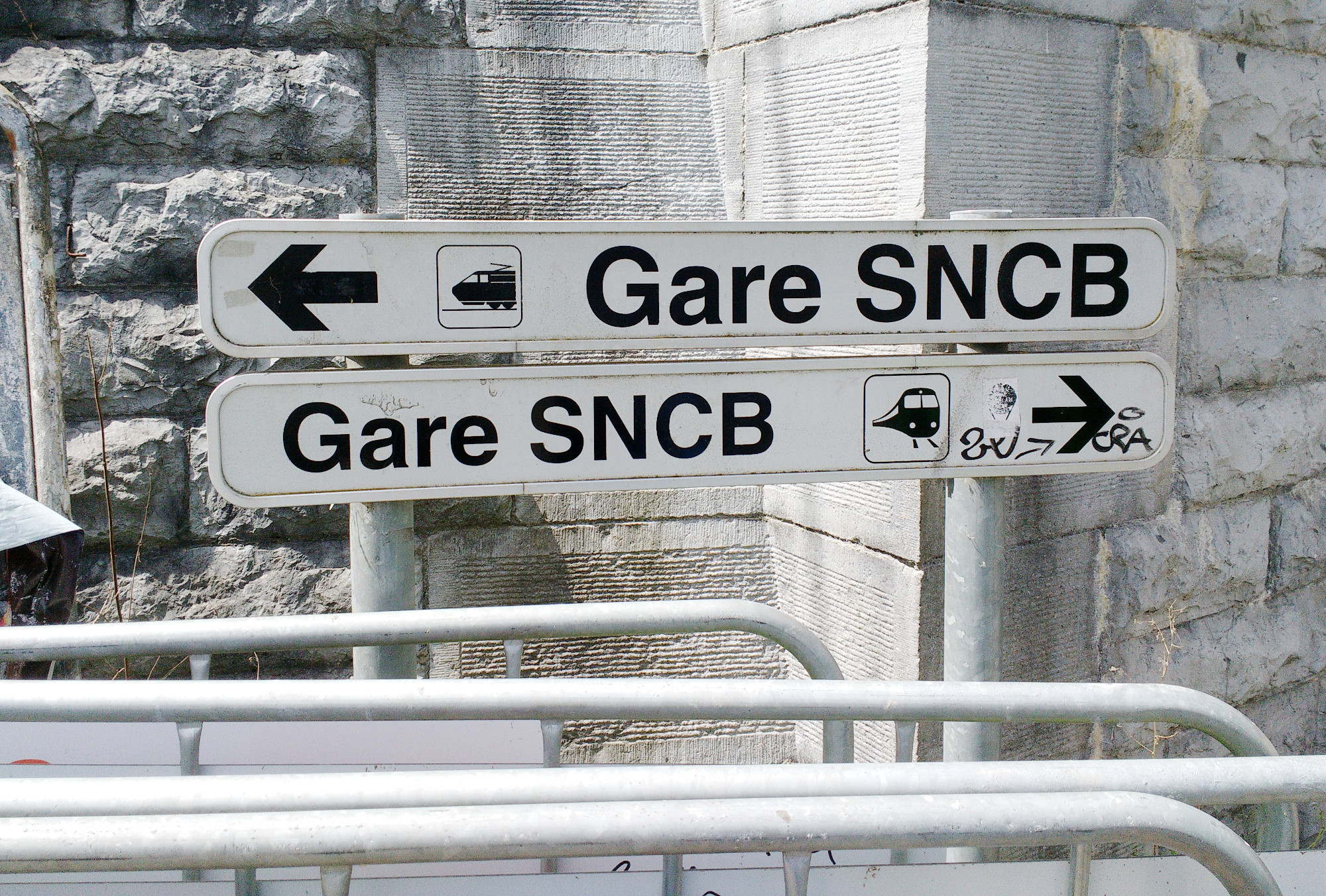
Belgian road signs F34a in Anseremme

F1a: Start of a built up area

F1a: Start of a built up area

F1b: Start of a built up area

F1b: Start of a built up area

F3a: End of a built up area

F3a: End of a built up area

F3b: End of a built up area

F3b: End of a built up area

F4a: Start of a 30 km/h speed zone

F4b: End of a 30 km/h speed zone

F5: Start of a motorway

F7: End of a motorway

F8: Tunnel

F9: Start of a motorroad

F11: End of a motorroad

F12a: Start of a living street

F12b: End of a living street

F13: Turn lane(s)

F14: Advanced stop line for bicycles

F15: Indication of the choice of direction

F17: Bus lane

F18: Bus and tram lane

F19: One-way road

F21: Pass on either side

F23a: Number of a national road

F23b: Number of a motorway

F23c: Number of an international road

F23d: Number of a ringroad

F25: Direction sign

F27: Direction sign

F29: Direction sign

F31: Direction sign (over motorways)

F33a: Direction sign

F33b: Direction sign (valley or stream)

F33c: Direction sign (touristic destination)

F34a: Direction sign (important public destinations)

F34b1: Direction sign (for cyclists, horse riders and pedestrians)

F34b2: Direction sign (for cyclists, horse riders and pedestrians)

F34c1: Direction sign (touristic destinations for cyclists, horse riders and pedestrians)

F34c2: Direction sign (touristic destinations for cyclists, horse riders and pedestrians)

F35: Direction sign (touristic destinations)

F37: Direction sign (hotels, hostels, restaurants ...)

F39: Direction sign (detours)

F41: Direction sign (detours)

F43: Municipal boundary

F45: Dead end

F45b: Dead end, except for pedestrians and cyclists

F47: End of roadworks

F49: Pedestrian crossing

F50: Cyclist and moped crossing

F50bis: Warning for cyclists and/or pedestrians when turning in

F51a: Crossing for pedestrians below ground

F51b: Crossing for pedestrians above ground

F52: Emergency exit in tunnel

F52bis: Emergency exit route

F53: Healthcare facility (hospital, nursing home ...)

F55: First aid post

F56: Fire extinguisher

F57: Stream

F59: Parking lot

F60: Parking garage

F61: Telephone

F62: Emergency telephone

F63: Fuel station

F65: Hotel or motel

F67: Restaurant

F69: Bar/café

F71: Camping area

F73: Trailer park

F75: Youth hostel

F77: Information point for foreigners or touristic information

F79: Reduction of lanes

F81: Lane displacement

F83: Cut through median

F85: Traffic allowed in both directions on a one-way road

F87: Hump

F89: Speed limit on certain lanes in ...m

F91: Speed limit on certain lanes

F93: Radio station broadcasting traffic information

F95: Runaway ramp

F97: Reduction of lanes

F98: Emergency bay

F99a: Start of a road or part of a road reserved for pedestrians, cyclists horse riders and drivers of speed pedelecs

F99b: Start of a road or part of a road reserved for pedestrians, cyclists horse riders and drivers of speed pedelecs with segregation

F99c: Start of a road or part of a road reserved for farm vehicles, pedestrians, cyclists horse riders and drivers of speed pedelecs

F101a: End of a road or part of a road reserved for pedestrians, cyclists horse riders and drivers of speed pedelecs

F101b: End of a road or part of a road reserved for pedestrians, cyclists horse riders and drivers of speed pedelecs with segregation

F101c: End of a road or part of a road reserved for farm vehicles, pedestrians, cyclists horse riders and drivers of speed pedelecs

F103: Start of a pedestrian zone

F105: End of a pedestrian zone

F111: Cycle street

F117: Start of a low emission zone

F118: End of a low emission zone

F119: Start of an airport zone

F120: End of an airport zone

== Additional signs (1975-2027) ==
M1: Only for bicyclists

M2: Except bicyclists

M3: Except bicyclists and mopeds class A (mofas)

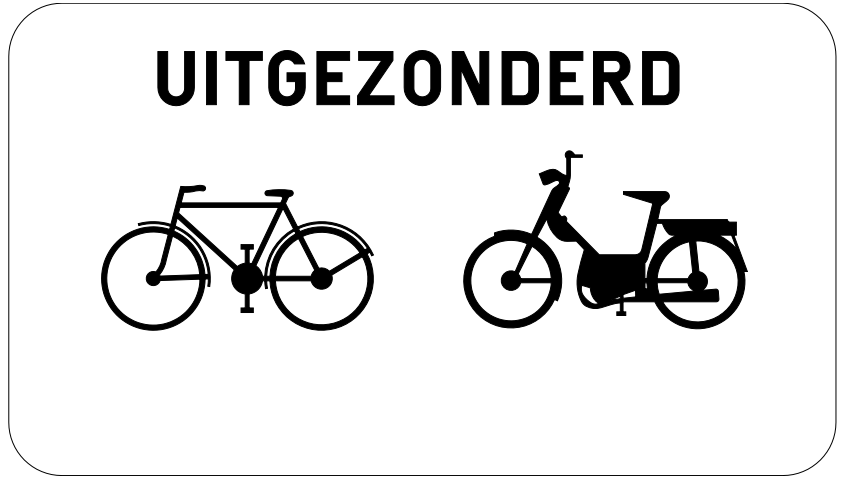
M3bis: Except bicyclists and mopeds

M4: Except bicyclists

M5: Except bicyclists and mopeds class A (mofas)

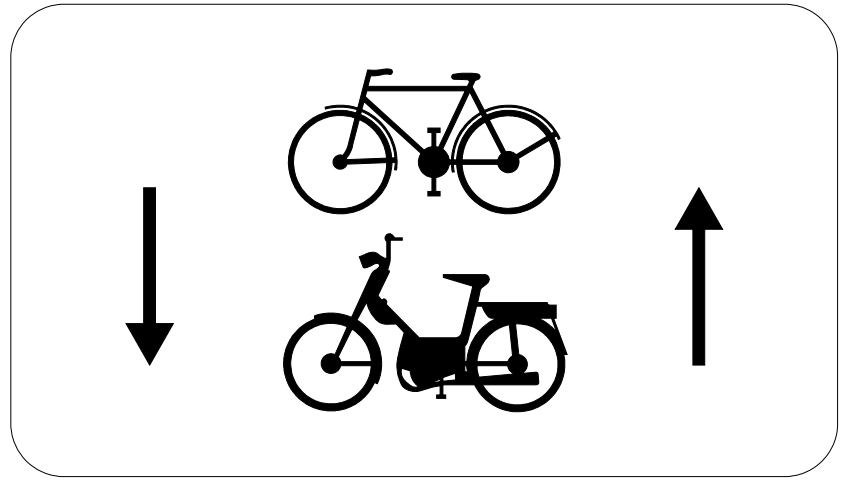
M5bis: Except bicyclists and mopeds

M6: Compulsory for mopeds class B

M7: Forbidden for mopeds class B

M8: Only for bicyclists and mopeds

M9: Bicyclists coming from left and right

M10: Bicyclists and mopeds coming from left and right

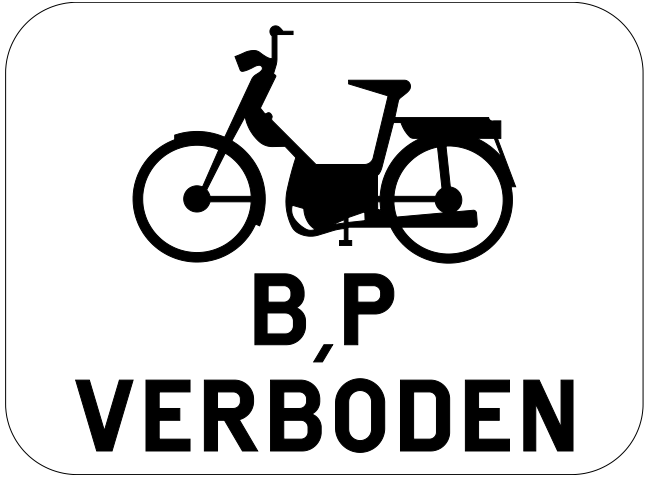
M16: Forbidden for mopeds class B and P (speed pedelecs)

GXI: Sign above only applies to the exit

GXa: Start of a parking regulation

GXb: End of a parking regulation

GXc: Parking regulation during the following ...m

GXd: Repeating a parking regulation

GVIId: Parking reserved for disabled people

== Icons (1975-2027) ==
S1: Airport

S2: Exposition center

S3: Harbour

S4: Car ferry

S5: Business and industrial zone

S10: Police department

S11: Fire department

S12: Civil protection

S13: Cemetery

S14: Bus terminal

S15: Train station

S16: Goods station

S17: City hall

S18: Religious building

S19: Court building

S20: Car shuttle train

S21: Post office

S30: Sports center

S31: Castle

S32: Ruins

S33: Monastery/abbey

S34: Cultural, recreational or amusement park

S35: Image of a monument or important landscape

S36: Park

== Traffic lights (1975-2027) ==
Red: Don't walk

Green: walk

== New road signs (2027 onwards) ==
A1a: Curve to the left

A1b: Curve to the right

A1c: Double curve, first to the left

A1d: Double curve, first to the right

A3: Steep descent

A5: Steep ascent

A7a: Road narrows

A8: Soft shoulders

A9: Opening bridge

A11: Quay or riverbank

A13: Uneven road

A14: Road hump

A15: Slippery road

A16: Ice or snow

A17: Loose surface

A18: Reduced visibility

A19: Falling roads

A21: Pedestrian crossing

A23: Children

A25: Cyclists

A27: Animals crossing (deer)

A27: Animals crossing (cattle)

A31: Roadworks

A32: Traffic queues

A33: Traffic signals

A35: Low-flying aircraft

A37: Crosswinds

A39: Two-way traffic

A41: Railroad crossing ahead with barriers

A43: Railroad crossing ahead without barriers

A45: Railroad crossing (single track)

A47: Railroad crossing (multiple tracks)

A49: Tramway crossing

A51: Other danger

B1: Yield

B5: Stop

B9: Priority road

B11: End of priority road

B15: Intersection with priority

B17: Intersection with priority to the right

B19: Yield to oncoming traffic

B21: Priority over oncoming traffic

B22: Yield to cyclists

C1: Do no enter

C3: No vehicles in both directions

C5: No entry for motor vehicles with more than two wheels and motorcycles with sidecar

C7: No entry for motorcycles

C8: No entry for tractors

C9: No entry for mopeds

C11: No entry for bicycles

C13: No entry for horse-drawn vehicles

C19: No entry for pedestrians

C21: Weight limit

C22: Axle weight limit

C23: No entry for buses

C24: No entry for trucks

C25a: No entry for vehicles transporting dangerous goods

C25b: No entry for vehicles transporting flammable or explosive goods

C25c: No entry for vehicles transporting water polluting goods

C26: Length limit

C27: Width limit

C29: Height limit

C30: No entry for vehicles towing caravans

C32a: No left turn

C32b: No right turn

C33: No U-turn

C35: No overtaking

C41: End of the overtaking restriction

C39: No overtaking for vehicles with a maximum allowed mass of over 3,5 tonnes

C41: End of the overtaking restriction for vehicles with a maximum allowed mass of over 3,5 tonnes

C43: Maximum speed

C45: End of the maximum speed restriction

C46: End of the restrictions imposed on moving vehicles

D1a: Ahead only

D1b: Turn right ahead

D1c: Turn left ahead

D1d: Pass on right

D1e: Pass on left

D1f: Turn right

D1g: Turn left

D3a: Turn right or ahead only

D3b: Turn left or ahead only

D3c: Turn left or right

D4: Direction of vehicles transporting dangerous goods

D5: Roundabout

D7: Cycleway

D8: End of cycleway

D9: Segregated path for pedestrians and cyclists

D9: Segregated path for pedestrians and cyclists

D11: Shared path for pedestrians and cyclists

D13: Footpath

D15: Bridlepath

E1: No parking

E3: No stopping

E9: Parking

== Retired signs ==
=== 1934 road signs ===
Uneven road

Series of bends

Crossroad

Level crossing with barriers

Level crossing without barriers

Danger

Yield

No vehicles

Do not enter

No motor vehicles with more than three wheels

No motorcycles

No motor vehicles

Weight limit

Weight limit for motor vehicles

Speed limit

No overtaking

No cycling

No stopping

No parking

Customs

Mandatory direction

Bicycle path

Parking

Caution recommended

First aid

=== 1954 road signs ===
==== Warning signs ====
Give way

Crossroad with priority

Crossroad

Railway crossing with gates

Railway crossing without gates

Uneven road

Dangerous bends

Steep descent

Road narrows

Opening bridge

Roadworks

Slippery surface

Pedestrian crossing

Children

Other danger

Countdown marker

Countdown marker

Countdown marker

Countdown marker

==== Prohibitory signs ====
No vehicles

No motor vehicles except motorcycles

No motorcycles

No lorries

No bicycles

No horse carts

No handcarts

No entry

Stop

Speed limit

Speed limit ends

No right turn

No left turn

No overtaking

Customs

Give way to oncoming traffic

No parking

Weight limit

Width limit

Height limit

==== Mandatory signs ====
Turn right

Turn left

Proceed straight

Roundabout

Bicycle path

==== Information signs ====
Priority over oncoming traffic

Parking

Hospital

First aid

Public telephone

Petrol station

Priority road

Priority road ends

=== Wegcode 1975 signs ===
B5: Stop

C48: No use of cruise control

C49: End of the cruise control restriction

F113: End of cycle street

== See also ==
- Transport in Belgium
- Road Signs in the Netherlands
- Comparison of European Road Signs
