= Beechey =

Beechey is a surname. Notable people with the name include:

- William Beechey (1753–1839), English painter
- Anne Beechey (1764–1833), British portrait painter, second wife of William
- Henry William Beechey (1788–1862) British painter and Egyptologist, son of William
- Frederick William Beechey (1796–1856), English naval officer and explorer, son of William
- St. Vincent Beechey (1806–1899), vicar and founder of Rossall School, son of William
- Richard Brydges Beechey (1808–1895), Anglo-Irish painter and naval officer, son of William
- Ernest Beechey (1886–1972), New Zealand cricketer, descendant of William via Frederick
- Norm Beechey (born 1932), retired Australian race car driver
- Adam Beechey (born 1981), Australian racing driver
- Tyler Beechey (born 1981), Canadian ice hockey player

== See also ==
- Beechey Island, a Canadian Arctic island named after Frederick William
- Lake Beechey, in Nunavut, Canada
- Beachy, a surname
- Beechy, a village in Saskatchewan, Canada
