= Frances Anne Hopkins =

English painter (1838–1919)

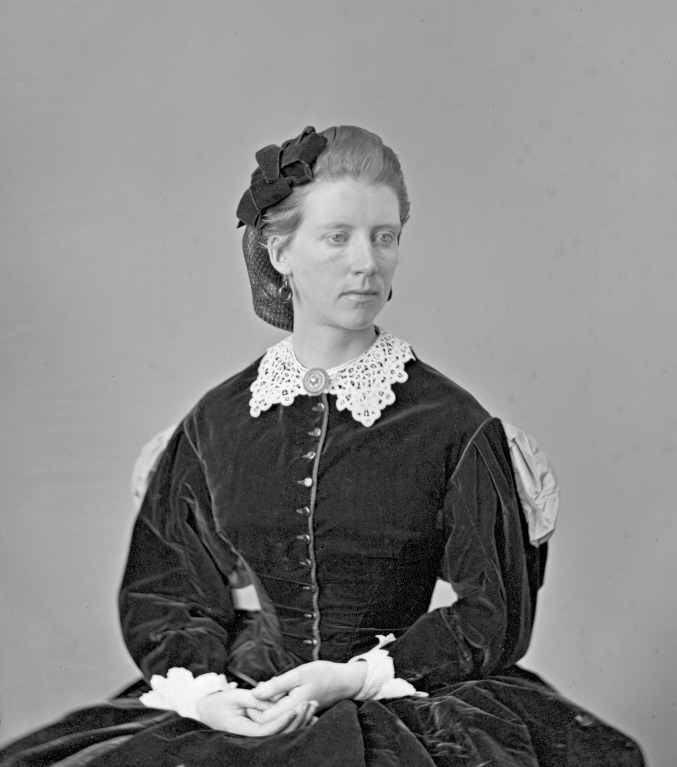
- Hopkins photographed in 1863 by William Notman
- Born: February 2, 1838; London, England
- Died: March 5, 1919 (aged 81); Hampstead, London, England
- Occupation: Painter
- Known for: Painting scenes of the fur trade in Canada
- Spouse: Edward Hopkins (m. 1858)
- Children: 3
- Father: Frederick William Beechey
- Relatives: William Beechey (grandfather); Anne Beechey (grandmother); Henry William Beechey (uncle); George Duncan Beechey (uncle); St. Vincent Beechey (uncle); Richard Brydges Beechey (uncle)

Frances Anne Hopkins (February 2, 1838 – March 5, 1919) was a British painter. She was the third of Frederick William Beechey's five children. In 1858, she married a Hudson's Bay Company official, Edward Hopkins, whose work took him to North America. Hopkins travelled along with him. While sailing, she was able to sketch extensively, therefore, capturing a now lost way of living – the last days of the fur trade.

Hopkins painted actively during the 1860s and 1870s. Her best-known works are several large paintings made from her sketches. She portrayed a voyageur's life in the mid-nineteenth century. Hopkins, however, remained relatively unknown until recently. At the same time, considering that, she was an artist placed in a context where gender-imposed restrictions were prevalent. In fact, Frances Anne Hopkins was dubbed as a woman who "staked out an identity based on difference: a woman in a group of men." Her works were featured at exhibitions of the Art Association of Montreal, followed by, eleven exhibitions at the Royal Academy in London.

The Hopkins family returned to England in 1870 where she lived until her death. Hopkins was an artist able to record an important aspect of Canadian history.

== Early personal life ==
Frances Anne Hopkins was born in London, England, to Frederick William Beechey, a hydrographer and a Rear Admiral in the Royal Navy, and Charlotte Stapleton on February 2, 1838.

Hopkins was from an upper-middle-class family. She came from a family of artists and Arctic explorers. Her father Sir Frederick was a water-colourist. Hopkin's aunt Anne Phyllis Beechey who was also known as Lady Beechey was a miniaturist. Her grandfather Sir William Beechey was also a portrait painter and a member of the Royal Academy of Arts. Hopkins' paintings and drawings suggest artistic training, but this may have been at home rather than in formal schooling.

At 20, she married Edward Martin Hopkins, the Hudson's Bay Company Governor-General's secretary, at St. Saviour's Church, Paddington, London. Edward Hopkins already had three children from his late wife, Anne (Ogden), who had died of cholera. Her husband's work would bring her on a journey that would provide subjects for her art pieces.

== Life in Canada ==
The Hopkins, along with Edward's three previous sons, moved to Lachine, Lower Canada shortly after their marriage in 1858. The Hopkins family moved to Lachine, as Edward worked there as secretary to Sir George Simpson, the Hudson's Bay Company's Governor General.

Hopkins' life in Lower Canada differed greatly from the lives of her female counterparts in London, who were from wealthy English families. In London, these artists mostly led "quiet, uneventful lives largely within the limited precincts of the studio." Hopkins was able to live a more adventurous life in Canada.

When she arrived at Lachine, the eastern station of the Montreal fur trade, with her husband and his sons, Hopkins began sketching and painting the environment that surrounded her new home without any delay. Some of her subjects included the Hopkins family's house and garden, which was on the shore of the St. Lawrence River, the house next door, the Lachine pier, and the nearby Dorval Island. The sketches she produced in her two years spent in Lachine were compiled into what is now known as the "Lachine Sketchbook" of 1858 to 1860, and the paintings she created in 1858 to 1859 are in the "Hopkins Album." In 1860, after the death of Sir George Simpson, Chief Factor Edward Hopkins was promoted to Superintendent of the Hudson's Bay Company's Montreal department, and as a result had to move his family from Lachine to the Côte-des-Neiges area of Montreal. By 1861 in Montreal, Hopkins had two sons of her own named Raymond and Wilfred, and had a daughter in 1863 named Olive. With three stepchildren and three of her own children to raise, a large home to maintain, and social obligations to tend to, she carried a large amount of responsibility, to which her husband Edward responded by hiring help to assist Hopkins with her domestic duties.

Hopkins was active in Montreal's upper-class society. She was a prominent hostess to important English visitors who came on fur trade-related business, and had social ties with the patrons of the arts in Montreal, who at the time, were establishing art societies and building their own, individual art collections. She was involved in the social society of Lachine prior to her move to Montreal as well, which was exemplified by her presence at festivities that were held in honour of the Prince of Wales' visit to Canada in 1860. A local newspaper wrote about the festivities shortly after they took place, stating that there were only three women in attendance, and that two of them were Hopkins and her sister, Miss Beechey. Hopkins also took the opportunity to produce some sketches during the festivities, which she later developed into large watercolours at the request of the Prince of Wales (later known as King Edward VII of the United Kingdom) for hanging at Windsor Castle.

Throughout her time in Canada, Hopkins accompanied her husband on many of his voyages, especially after Edward was promoted to Superintendent of the Hudson's Bay Company's Montreal department. In Montreal, Hopkins joined Edward on several of his tours of inspection of his fur-trade posts, which stretched from the Mingan District to Fort Williams, Ontario. Travelling by canoe was becoming less common in Canada as railroads developed and improved, but travel to and from remote trading posts on the Great Lakes was still often by canoe. On these voyages, and on trips she took for pleasure, Hopkins sketched and recorded her experiences and her surroundings. With her husband's support for her and her art, Hopkins was able to independently travel by canoe, which was very rare for women to do at the time. As a result of this, she became one of the only female artists to be directly involved in the canoe voyage scene.

Hopkins took several trips between the years of 1858 and 1870, accompanied by her husband, to places such as Manitoulin Island in Lake Huron, and Kakabeka Falls near Lake Superior. She took the opportunity to sketch while on these voyages and eventually turned many of her sketches into the voyageur paintings she is associated with today. Hopkins and her husband also made short visits to England, where she exhibited her work, and vacationed in France.

In 1869, Hopkins and her husband took a farewell tour of Lake Superior, as retirement from the Hudson's Bay Company was approaching. In 1870, Hopkins became the first woman to show a large body of work at an exhibition in Montreal. Later that same year, the Hopkins family moved back to England permanently without two of their sons, as one died in 1864 and the other in early 1869.

== Artistic career ==
Frances Anne Hopkins' (née Beechey) was already a skilful artist at the time of her marriage to Edward Hopkins in 1858. Growing up in an upper-middle-class family, it is probable that she would have been provided with tutoring in the fine arts, specialising in education in drawing and painting. However, there is no confirmed documentation of this.

The Beechey family was already a well-known family of artists, most importantly, her grandfather Sir William Beechey, a portrait painter and member of the Royal Academy of Arts, Lady Beechey, a miniaturist, and Frances' father was an accomplished water-colorist, thought to have been trained in the topographical landscape. Hopkins, already have been exposed to fine arts in her youth by her family, saw the chance to travel to Canada and paint, was seen by her as both a personal venture, as well as a professional opportunity.

Hopkins' earliest known sketches of Canada coincide with her immediate arrival in Canada from 1858 to 1860, which were prominently scenes of Lachine and Montréal. During her travels outdoors, she would primarily be working with watercolour, which was a typical medium for outdoor artwork at the time due to how easy it is to transport. The travels that would influence her well-known oil paintings later on were mostly inspired from her tours of the fur trading routes with her husband—during 1864, 1866, and 1869, they visited the Upper Great Lakes and the Mattawa (Ont.) and Ottawa rivers.

During the years between 1869 and 1880, Hopkins completed some of her most well-known oil paintings in her studio in Hampstead, England upon returning there permanently. In 1869, Hopkins exhibited her oil painting Canoes in a Fog, Lake Superior at the Royal Academy in London. This marked an important turning point in her career because her popularity in Britain gradually became larger, as the romantic atmosphere her paintings possessed was highly appealing to the British audience, and they sold better on the London art market compared to that of the North American art market. The next oil painting of hers that would be exhibited at the Royal Academy was Canoe Travelling in the Backwoods of Canada. Between the years of 1860 and 1891, Hopkins would exhibit a total of eleven times at the Royal Academy.

Other well-known paintings of hers include Shooting the Rapids (1879), Canoe Manned by Voyageurs Passing a Waterfall (1869), Canoe Party Around a Campfire (1870), and Voyageurs at Dawn (1871). Landscape painting at the time was considered rigorous for a woman, however, Hopkins' travels to Canada allowed Hopkins to establish her reputation as a professional painter that specialised in landscape painting of the Canadian wilderness.

Her painting has strong use of narrative, stylistic and photographic language. There is debate as to what artistic style of painting Hopkins conforms to, however she is often identified with realism, as well as the presence of romantic idealism within her paintings. Today, her voyageur paintings are fairly recognisable because of how often they are used for textbook and periodical illustration, however her name has faded into obscurity. In her lifetime, she only exhibited in Canada once at the Art Association of Montréal in 1870. It wasn't until over a hundred years later in 1990 would her work be organised into an extensive exhibition of Frances Anne Hopkins by guest curator Janet Clark at the Thunder Bay Art Gallery. The show travelled onward to The Art Gallery of Ontario (Toronto), The National Archives of Canada (Ottawa, Ontario) and to the Glenbow Museum (Calgary, Alberta). Her work is now found at several museums throughout Canada such as the Glenbow Museum in Alberta, as well as a large collection of her works reside in the National Library and Archives of Canada.

== Later life ==
After moving back to England, Frances Anne Hopkins continued to paint or draw almost daily. She worked out of her own studio in Hampstead, England. Hopkins completed several oil paintings that reflected her life in Canada, using her memories of the Canadian landscape and sketches she had produced while living there as references. Her husband died in England in 1893, causing Hopkins to become more deeply involved in the business aspect of her art career in order to provide herself with additional income. This involvement consisted of producing paintings on demand for her clients, sending her artwork to various art dealers and commercial galleries, and selling her own work, which she set the prices for herself. She also continued to exhibit her work at the Royal Academy in London, with her last exhibition being held in 1902. Hopkins died in Hampstead, London, on 5 March 1919. She was eighty-one years old.

== Style and works ==
Hopkins' sea voyage with her HBC-affiliated husband had a significant impact to her artworks. The theme of canoe handling is consistent in her paintings and sketches. The vastness of the ocean became Hopkins' workspace, where she had fostered her creativity. Her subject matter was genre and landscape. The paintings show voyageurs and their canoes with her husband and herself amongst the paddlers. In her paintings, she portrayed in great detail the needed skills in the manoeuvring of canoes placed in romantic scenes. Her contemporary subjects displayed vivid realism. Her oeuvre embodies the voyageur's vigour, concentration, endurance, and competence. Critics applauded her knack for clarity and accuracy. This painting style of realism has been associated with her, although, her style remains unidentified. Moreover, some of her paintings depict a blend of romantic idealism, notably, the naturalistic aspect of her other works.

In 1860, Hopkin's artworks were first on display at the London exhibition. At the Royal Society of British Artists Exhibition, three of her watercolour paintings were on display. Canoes in a Fog - Lake Superior was a stepping stone for Hopkins; this was the first of her many paintings that will make it to the Royal Academy of London. A total of five other paintings made it to the list which is: Left to Die, Canadian Voyageurs on Lake Superior starting at Sunrise, Wilfred Hopkins (Portrait of Son) and lastly Running a rapid on the Mattawa River, Canada, these were accomplished from the year 1869 to 1878. Today, many of her paintings are part of the collection of the Library and Archives of Canada.

=== List of notable works ===
Work	Title	Completion date	Currently found at
	Canadian Habitant	1858	Library and Archives Canada, Ottawa, ON
	At Marquette, Michigan	1864	Library and Archives Canada, Ottawa, ON
	Île Dorval	1866	Library and Archives Canada, Ottawa, ON
	Saint Dominique Street, Montreal	1866	Library and Archives Canada, Ottawa, ON
	The Lumber Raft	1868	Library and Archives Canada, Ottawa, ON
	Canoes in a Fog, Lake Superior	1869	Glenbow Museum, Calgary, AB
	Canoe Manned by Voyageurs Passing a Waterfall	1869	
	Canoe Party Around a Campfire	1870	Library and Archives Canada, Ottawa, ON
	Encampment of Voyageurs	1870	Library and Archives Canada, Ottawa, ON
	Minnehaha Feeding Birds	Approx. 1870	
	Left to Die	1872	Library and Archives Canada, Ottawa, ON
	The Red River Expedition at Kakabeka Falls, Ontario	1877	Library and Archives Canada, Ottawa, ON
	Voyageurs at Dawn	1871	Library and Archives Canada, Ottawa, ON
	Shooting the Rapids	1879	Library and Archives Canada, Ottawa, ON
	At Lyons-a-la-Foret, Normandy	Undated	Art Gallery of Greater Victoria, BC
	Canoe Travelling in the Backwoods of Canada	Undated	

== Legacy ==
Hopkins was an affiliated member of the North British Academy of Arts. Her association with the institution paved way to a watercolour painting of hers exhibited in the city of York.

Her works became a reliable source for educators such as for historical purposes. These were due to Hopkins' oeuvre retaining an image of Canada's colonial past.

Thomas Schultze has written an extensively annotated book of Hopkins's work, which was published by Penumbra Press in spring 2008. The publication details a look at Hopkins' talent neglected by time, an artist who proved herself in a male-dominated profession.

In 1988, a stamp featured one of her paintings and an inset sepia photograph of the artist.

In 2015, her work was included on the cover and discussed with illustrations in The Artist Herself: Self-Portraits by Canadian Historical Artists, an exhibition co-curated by Alicia Boutilier and Tobi Bruce who also co-edited the book/catalogue.

In 2018, Canadian photographer Naomi Harris recreated the portage trips taken by Hopkins, by paddling a canoe up to Thunder Bay in Ontario while wearing 19th-century clothing.

== Record sale prices ==
At the Cowley Abbott Auction, Important Canadian Art (Sale 2), December 1, 2022, lot #138, Voyageurs Encampment (Camp Scene on the Ottawa) (1867), oil on canvas, 15 x 26.25 ins ( 38.1 x 66.7 cms ), estimated at $70,000.00 - $90,000.00, realized a price of $552,000.00.
