= Beachey =

Beachey is the family name of a notable aviation pioneer from the U.S., Lincoln Beachey and a noted academic, Raymond Beachey.

In North America, the name appears most often as an anglicization of Bitsche, a placename in both Switzerland and Alsace Lorraine, France.

Other anglicizations of the name are: Beachy, Beechy, and Beechey.
