= The Billboard Creative =

Art organization in Los Angeles, California, US

- Formation: 2015; 10 years ago
- Founder: Adam Santelli, Kim Kerscher, Mona Kuhn
- Type: Nonprofit 501(c)(3) organization
- Headquarters: Los Angeles, California, US

The Billboard Creative is a 501(c)(3) not-for-profit arts organization that places artwork by established and emerging artists from around the world on otherwise empty billboards at major junctions across the city of Los Angeles. It was founded in 2015.

== History ==
The Billboard Creative was founded in Los Angeles, California in 2015 by Adam Santelli, Kim Kerscher and Mona Kuhn. It then began producing art shows by renting out unused billboard space as "art replaces advertising" at some of the busiest intersections throughout Los Angeles, for an entire month, annually.

As a nonprofit group, The Billboard Creative has continued to grow by partnering with cultural institutions and distinguished artists. The organization plans to continue providing opportunities for artists to share their work with the broadest audience possible through upcoming special exhibitions, new media projects, and expanding its outdoor art shows to other cities nationwide.

=== 2015 artists ===
Fall curated by Mona Kuhn, and included artists Shane Guffogg, Kim McCarty, Jack Pierson, Silvia Poloto, and Ed Ruscha.

=== 2016 artists ===
Curated by Mona Kuhn, and included artists Paul McCarthy and Alex Prager.

=== 2017 artists ===
Curated by TBC, and included artists Alex Prager, Jennifer Steinkamp, and Mona Kuhn.

=== 2018 artists ===
Curated by Andrea Blanch, and included artists Naomi Harris, Marianne Kolb, Steve Miller, Marilyn Minter, Laurie Simmons, Gerald Slota, Spencer Tunick, and Lawrence Weiner.
