= Mona Kuhn =

Brazilian contemporary photographer (born 1969)

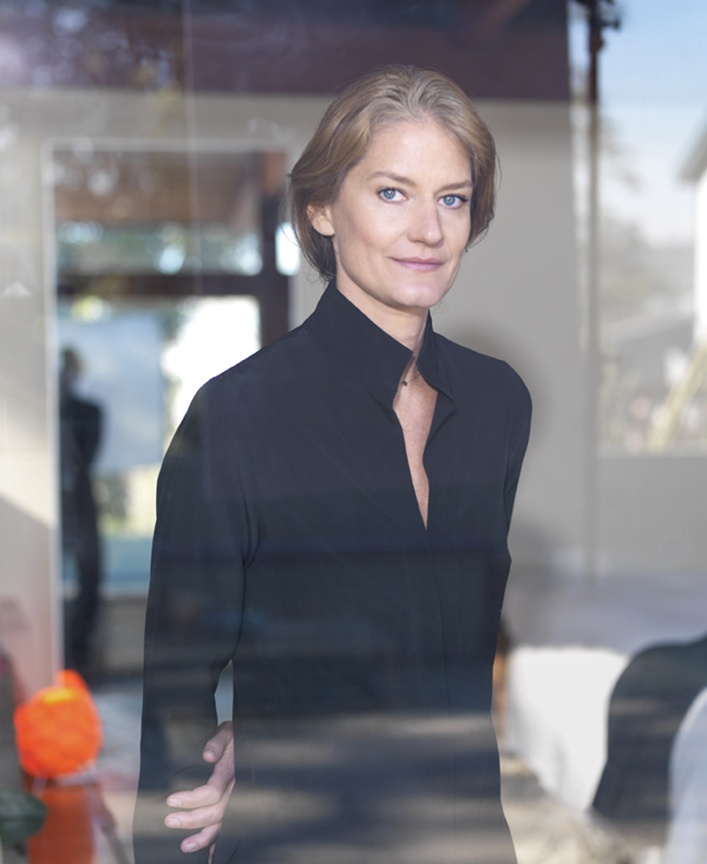
- Mona Kuhn in 2017
- Born: 1969 (age 56–57); São Paulo, Brazil
- Known for: Photography
- Website: www.monakuhn.com

Mona Kuhn (born 1969 in São Paulo, Brazil) is a Brazilian-born American contemporary photographer best known for her large-scale photographs of the human form and essence. An underlying current in Kuhn's work is her reflection on our longing for spiritual connection and solidarity. As a result, her approach is unusual in that she develops close relationships with her subjects, resulting in images of remarkable intimacy. Kuhn's work shows the human body in its natural state while simultaneously re-interpreting the nude as a contemporary canon of art. Her work often references classical themes, has been exhibited internationally, and is held in several collections including the J. Paul Getty Museum, The Los Angeles County Museum of Art, the Hammer Museum and the Pérez Art Museum Miami.

Born in São Paulo, Brazil to parents of German ancestry, Mona Kuhn lives and works in Los Angeles, United States.

== Early life ==
Mona Kuhn began taking photographs at age 12, when her parents gave her a Kodak camera for her birthday. Kuhn has attributed her interest to her early formative years:

"I didn't grow up with cousins and I didn't grow up with grandparents … so I think I always had, since I was a child, a slight inner need to bond or to create a small family. I think that the people that I photograph, if I look at all my series, were all people that could have been my extended family. That's how I treat them. And that's the real little seed that maybe comes from infancy."

She moved to the United States in 1992 to attend Ohio State University and then furthered her studies at the San Francisco Art Institute, moving to San Francisco at the height of the Bay Area Figurative Movement. Kuhn has noted that her artistic influences shift as she is always looking to what is next and eager to learn something new, but has said: "I learned the most by looking at Richard Diebenkorn's composition, Lucian Freud's relationship with models, Georgia O'Keeffe's subtleties and Lee Miller's courage."

== Art career ==
Kuhn chose the nude as the focus of her work because it represents a timeless canon and she was interested in the idea of the body as residence. Her early work focused on details of the body in black and white; she is quoted as saying:

"I was not yet comfortable photographing the full figure. As I became more comfortable and as I stepped back with the camera and started seeing more of the environment, I realized right away that color was very important … that color was all around and balancing color became very important for me, and it also became a source of inspiration. Every new series starts with me imagining a palette; and then I grow from there."

In an interview with Vanity Fair, Kuhn described her approach to photographing the nude saying: "Photographing someone in the nude is my attempt to reach that moment of perfect balance, the light of awareness in the way we perceive life to be. The nude is present in my work not as a one-dimensional physical manifestation, but rather as a proof of our being, our presence in time, and ultimately caring for what will be lost." She further explains, "I'm most comfortable representing the nude as minimal, timeless, somewhat monastic, and mostly pensive. I enjoy the nuances, the elegance of simplicity; the rustic forms because it brings us close to our own nature and sense of self. My works are not meant to be of this time, but to transcend, in its basic form, the elements of time."

Kuhn's first monograph titled Photographs was published by Steidl in 2004. Photographs was followed by Evidence in 2007, which was accompanied with a short story by Frederic Tuten. Her next project, released in 2010, was a return to her homeland of Brazil, with a series titled Native and an accompanying monograph of the same name published by Steidl. In 2011, Kuhn released Bordeaux Series, also with a monograph published by Steidl, which is a collection of traditional portraits and landscapes. Kuhn's work has been described as "intimate and sensuous," "dreamlike" and "classical" in composition and her approach is unusual in that she develops close relationships with her subjects, resulting in images of remarkable intimacy. Kuhn describes her relationship with her subjects saying: "My best work starts when they forget they are naked. We entered a parallel reality, something that is lifted from the everyday, a quiet moment that is floating there."

Kuhn describes her visual vocabulary as figurative, however recent works have begun explorations with abstraction. "I wanted to escape the body and photograph the human presence coming in and out of evidence, at times overexposed, at times hidden in shadows, like a desert mirage, a solitary figure who could have been the very first or last."

In 2018, Kuhn released two monographs: She Disappeared into Complete Silence (Steidl) and Bushes & Succulents (Stanley Barker). Kuhn selected American architect Robert Stone's glass house in the California desert as the setting for She Disappeared into Complete Silence saying: "In a way, the glass house with mirrors felt like an extension of my own camera, and the perfect setting for the series "She Disappeared into Complete Silence." In that space, we were able to push representation into a series of images emphasizing a refracted presence and its metaphors. Many of the images were shot by observing tangents, and I enjoyed working with variations of basically the same material: sand, glass, and mirrors." In a 2018 interview with Kuhn, Betsy Morales interpreted Bushes & Succulents for Museé Magazine, "Pastel succulents and serene bodies are paired together to cast a hypnotic spell on the viewer that ultimately compliment [sic] female essence."

In the same year, Kuhn presented her first immersive installation piece, Experimental, a 5,000-square-foot exhibition at The Fruit in Durham, North Carolina. Writer Julie M. Hamilton explains "In Experimental, Kuhn employs video projections, vinyl installation, and other mixed media to build her photos into an environment in which spectators can contemplate and deconstruct notions of the self. In this sense, the audience is the exhibit's subject, performing the work as a participant." Kuhn explains that the immersive installation surrounds guests with sounds, images and projections that allow them to interact with her artwork, rather than simply observing it passively. Her photography, featured in the installation, utilizes a desert landscape and light to symbolically portray human self-discovery in a natural environment. Kuhn's experimentation with reflections and light either reveals the interior of a subject or enshrouds them in shadow. By controlling the effects of light, Kuhn gives the appearance that her subjects are disappearing into the landscape.

In 2021, Thames & Hudson published Mona Kuhn: Works, a retrospective of Kuhn's career spanning more than twenty years and named her "one of the most respected contemporary photographers of her time." The volume includes previously unseen work and features images highlighting underlying themes from throughout Kuhn's career, namely her reflection on humanity's longing for spiritual connection and solidarity. Kuhn's photographs are accompanied with texts by Rebecca Morse, Chris Littlewood, Darius Himes and Simon Baker and an interview with Elizabeth Avedon, providing insights into Kuhn's creative process and the ways in which she works with her subjects and settings.

In 2022, Kuhn debuted her series Kings Road as a multimedia and sound installation at the Art, Design & Architecture Museum at UC Santa Barbara. Inspired by a love letter written by renowned midcentury architect Rudolph Schindler to an anonymous woman, the exhibition centered around Kuhn’s visual interpretation of the woman, photographed at the Schindler House on Kings Road in West Hollywood. Kuhn collaborated with composer Boris Salchow, who created an original score for the exhibition. In 2023, Kunsthaus-Göttingen in Germany featured a large-scale exhibition curated by Gerhard Steidl, spanning three floors and comprising multimedia pieces, solarized prints, artifacts from Schindler’s archive, and Kuhn’s own publications. In 2024, Kuhn presented Between Modernism and Surrealism at Edwynn Houk Gallery in New York City, where solarized photographs from Kings Road were on view alongside artworks by Man Ray, László Moholy-Nagy, Dora Maar, Erwin Blumenfeld, and Bill Brandt. In a review of the exhibition, writer Loring Knoblauch remarks, “What’s intriguing about these pairings is that Kuhn’s use of solarization is hardly ever truly surreal or deliberately jolting; instead she uses the technique to create a kind of lyrical mystery that fits the underlying narrative of the unknown woman in Schindler’s life. Kuhn envisages this figure as seductively ethereal, passing through Schindler’s house like a spirit and haunting his daydreams like an impressionistic hallucination. In this way, she’s redirected solarization in her own direction, infusing it with a fresh blast of energy and life.”

== Other professional activities ==
In addition to fine art photography, Kuhn has an extensive career with fashion and editorial work. She shot Bottega Veneta's resort 2012 campaign and has collaborated with Chanel and Dior. She has photographed for numerous publications, including Numéro, Le Monde, Harper's Bazaar, and W (magazine). Her portrait subjects include Tom Hiddleston, Sarah Paulson and Liev Schreiber.

Kuhn has been invited to curate exhibitions, most recently curating a show for The Billboard Creative, which placed works by emerging and established artists on billboards across Los Angeles. She curated Under My Skin at Flowers Gallery in New York City in 2013 and juried (Un)Clothed at The Center for Fine Art Photography, also in 2013.

Kuhn teaches at UCLA and ArtCenter College of Design and has been an independent scholar at the Getty Research Institute in Los Angeles since 1998.

== Selected exhibitions ==
Solo Exhibitions:

- 2024 Mona Kuhn: The Schindler House, A Love Affair, Galerie XII, Los Angeles
- 2024 Mona Kuhn: Between Modernism and Surrealism, Houk Gallery, New York, NY
- 2023 Mona Kuhn: Kings Road, Galerie XII, Paris, France
- 2023 Mona Kuhn: Kings Road, Jackson Fine Art, Atlanta
- 2023 Mona Kuhn: Kings Road, Kunsthaus Göttingen
- 2021 Mona Kuhn: Works, Edwynn Houk Gallery, New York
- 2021 Mona Kuhn: Works, Flowers Gallery, London
- 2021 Mona Kuhn: Works, Galerie XII, Los Angeles + Paris + Shanghai
- 2021 Mona Kuhn: 835 Kings Road, Art, Design and Architecture Museum, Santa Barbara
- 2020 Still Light, Jardin du Bra'haus, Montée du Château, Clervaux, Luxembourg
- 2020 Mona Kuhn: Early Depictions, Flowers Gallery, London
- 2020 Intimate, UP Gallery, Taipei, Taiwan
- 2019 She Disappeared into Complete Silence, Cite de l'Image, Clervaux, Luxembourg
- 2019 Mona Kuhn: Intimate, UPGallery, Taipei, Taiwan
- 2019 Bushes and Succulents, Euqinom Gallery, San Francisco
- 2019 Mona Kuhn: She Disappeared, Jackson Fine Art, Atlanta
- 2018 Mona Kuhn: Experimental, Fruit Factory, Durham Triangle, North Carolina
- 2018 Mona Kuhn: New Works, Part II, Galerie Catherine Hug, Paris, France
- 2018 Mona Kuhn: Selected Works, Porch Gallery, Ojai, California
- 2017 Mona Kuhn: The First Chapter, Euqinom Projects, San Francisco, California
- 2016 Mona Kuhn: New Works, Galerie Catherine Hug, Paris, France
- 2016 Mona Kuhn: Acido Dorado, Galeria Pilar Serra, Madrid, Spain
- 2015 Private, Galerie Ernst Hilger, Vienna, Austria
- 2015 Private, Flowers Gallery, London, England
- 2015 Private, Jackson Fine Art, Atlanta
- 2014 Acido Dorado, Edwynn Houk Gallery, New York
- 2014 Acido Dorado, Flowers Gallery, London
- 2012 Bordeaux Series, Galerie Particuliere, Paris, France
- 2012 Native, Galeria Pilar Serra, Madrid, Spain
- 2012 Bordeaux Series, Jackson Fine Art, Atlanta
- 2012 Bordeaux, Flowers Gallery, New York, New York
- 2012 Native, Brancolini Grimaldi, Florence, Italy
- 2011 Bordeaux, Flowers Gallery, London, England
- 2010 Native, Flowers Gallery, London, England
- 2010 Native, Flowers Gallery, New York, New York
- 2009 Native, M+B Gallery, Los Angeles, California
- 2009 Native, Jackson Fine Art, Atlanta, Georgia
- 2008 Evidence, Jarach Gallery, Venice, Italy
- 2007 Evidence, Scott Nichols Gallery, San Francisco, California
- 2007 Evidence, Charles Cowles Gallery, New York, New York
- 2007 Mona Kuhn, Estiarte Gallery, Madrid, Spain
- 2007 Evidence, Jackson Fine Art, Atlanta, Georgia
- 2007 Less Than Innocent, M+B Gallery, Los Angeles, California
- 2005 Mona Kuhn – Recent Color Work, Charles Cowles Gallery, New York, New York
- 2005 Mona Kuhn-Close, Jackson Fine Art, Atlanta, Georgia
- 2005 Unbounded Youth, Fahey/Klein Gallery, Los Angeles, California
- 2004 Mona Kuhn-Color, Camerawork, Berlin, Germany
- 2004 New Work, G. Gibson Gallery, Seattle, Washington
- 2004 Corporeal Space, Galerie F5.6, Munique, Germany
- 2004 Mona Kuhn – Color Photographs, Scott Nichols Gallery, San Francisco, California
- 2004 Still Memory, PhotoEye Gallery, Santa Fe, New Mexico
- 2004 Body Language, Camerawork AG, Hamburg, Germany
- 2003 Somata, Schumann Galerie, Munique, Germany
- 2002 Mona Kuhn-recent work, Momus Gallery, Atlanta, Georgia
- 2001 Mona Kuhn-recent work, Scott Nichols Gallery, San Francisco, California
- 2001 Bare, Yossi Milo Gallery, New York, New York
- 2001 Mona Kuhn, Bassetti Fine Art Photo Gallery, New Orleans, Louisiana
- 2000 Bei Nahe, Bodo Niemann Galerie, Berlin, Germany
- 2000 Mona Kuhn, G.Gibson Gallery, Seattle, Washington
- 1999 Mona Kuhn-recent work, Scott Nichols Gallery, San Francisco, California
- 1998 Mona Kuhn Nus, Elkis Gallery, São Paulo, Brazil
- 1997 Mona Kuhn, Tappert Galerie, Berlin, Germany

Group Exhibitions:

- 2024 I See You, Bildhalle Amsterdam, Netherlands
- 2024 Terrible Beauty, Gmunden Photo Festival, Austria
- 2022 Memories of Perception, Galerie Stephan Witschi, Zurich, Switzerland
- 2022 Undressed, Falsterbo Art Museum, Sweden
- 2021 Beyond Appearances, Kunstraum, Brooklyn, New York
- 2021 Keeper of the Hearth, Houston Center for Photography, Texas
- 2021 Women On Women, Galerie XII, Los Angeles
- 2020 Unseen: 35 Years of Collecting Photographs, The J. Paul Getty Museum, Los Angeles
- 2020 Isolation: Solitary & Suspended, Flowers Gallery, London, UK
- 2020 Eros and Psyche in Photography, Chaussee 36, Berlin, Germany
- 2020 14th Julia Margaret Cameron Awards Exhibition, Mediterranean House of Photography, Barcelona
- 2020 A Handful of Dust, Taipei Fine Arts Museum, Taiwan
- 2020 Picturing Roland Barthes, Meadows Museum of Art, Louisiana
- 2019 Her Ground: Women Photographing Landscape, Flowers Gallery, London, UK
- 2019 From Cosmic to the Domestic, The Polygon, Vancouver, Canada
- 2019 Contemporary II, Flowers Gallery, London, UK
- 2018 A Handful of Dust: from the Cosmic to the Domestic, The Polygon Gallery, Vancouver, Canada
- 2018 Anna Atkins Refracted: Contemporary Works, New York Public Library, New York
- 2018 Haute Photographie, Rotterdam, The Netherlands
- 2018 A Handful of Dust, UCR/California Museum of Photography, Riverside, California
- 2018 Staged, PhotoFairs, San Francisco, California
- 2018 This is Not a Selfie, Williamson Gallery, Pasadena, California
- 2017 A Handful of Dust, Whitechapel Gallery, London, UK
- 2017 Nudes, Gallery Grob, Geneva, Switzerland
- 2017 Spring Show, Flowers Gallery, London, UK
- 2017 JAM!, The Billboard Creative, Los Angeles, California
- 2017 Private at Art Rotterdam, The Ravestijn Gallery, Amsterdam, the Netherlands
- 2017 Poems at Art Geneve, Gallery Grob, Geneva, Switzerland
- 2016 Boundless, Museum of Photographic Arts, San Diego, California
- 2016 Out of Obscurity, Flowers Gallery, London, UK
- 2016 Contemporary California Artists, Museum of Photographic Arts, San Diego, California
- 2016 Love Potions, Maloney Fine Art, Los Angeles
- 2015 The Billboard Creative, Los Angeles
- 2014 Human Nature: Boomoon, Nadav Kander and Mona Kuhn, Flowers Gallery, London, England
- 2014 Living Rooms: Robert Wilson Collection, Le Louvre, Paris, France
- 2013 Image Search, Pérez Art Museum Miami, Florida
- 2013 Staking Claim, Museum of Photographic Arts, San Diego
- 2013 Under My Skin: Contemporary Nudes, Flowers Gallery, New York
- 2013 The Salt in My Skin: Mona Kuhn and Esther Teichmann, Flowers Gallery, London
- 2013 Mona Kuhn and Carla van de Puttelaar, Kahmann Gallery, Amsterdam
- 2013 Spring Photography Selection, Flowers Gallery, London
- 2012 Nudes, Flowers Gallery, New York
- 2011 Magie des Objekts, Leopold Museum, Vienna, Austria
- 2011 Royal Academy of Arts, Summer Exhibition, London, England
- 2011 Traummänner, Deichtorhallen Hamburg, Germany
- 2011 100 Portraits, Australian Center for Photography, Sydney
- 2010 State of Mind, Museum of Photographic Arts, San Diego, California
- 2009 On the way to Robert Frank, Musée de l'Elysée, Lausanne, Switzerland
- 2009 Au Feminin, Centre Culturel Calouste Gulbenkian, Paris, France
- 2009 Anonymity, Sol Mednick Gallery, University of the Arts, Philadelphia, Pennsylvania
- 2008 Modern Photographs, The Parrish Art Museum, Southampton, New York
- 2008 People and Places, Southwest Center for Contemporary Art, North Carolina
- 2007 Featured Works of Contemporary Art, North Carolina Museum of Art, North Carolina
- 2007 The Machine, the Body and the City, Miami Museum of Art, Florida
- 2006 The Body Familiar, Current Perspectives of the Nude, Griffin Museum, Boston, Massachusetts
- 2005 Portrait & Figure Study in Contemporary Photography, Westport Arts Center, Connecticut
- 2005 Face Cachée, Galerie Esther Woerdehoff, Paris, France
- 2005 The Children's Hour, Museum of New Art, Michigan
- 2004 Il nudo nell'arte, Galleria d'Arte Moderna, Bologna, Italy
- 2003 Traditions on Figure, G. Gibson Gallery, Seattle, Washington
- 2002 March Group Exhibition, G.Gibson Gallery, Seattle, Washington
- 2002 Collective, Vickie Bassetti Fine Art, New Orleans, Louisiana
- 2001 Love and Trust, Momus Gallery, Atlanta, Georgia
- 2001 Best of 2001 curated by Jack Spencer, Cumberland Gallery, Tennessee
- 2001 PhotoMetro, SFAC Gallery, San Francisco, California
- 2000 German Artists, Scott Nichols Gallery, San Francisco, California
- 2000 Among Us, Paba Gallery, New Haven, Connecticut
- 2000 Collective, G. Gibson Gallery, Seattle, Washington
- 2000 The Body in Art, Francoise Gallery, Maryland, Virginia
- 2000 Nudes from Past to Present, Etherton Gallery, Tucson, Arizona
- 2000 Love, Vorpal Gallery, San Francisco, California
- 1999 Collective Figurative Artists, Mauritz Gallery, Columbus, Ohio
- 1999 Female Figures, WomanMade Gallery, Chicago, Illinois
- 1998 Bare Skin, Columbus Museum of Art, Columbus, Ohio
- 1998 Minimal Skin, Museum of Arts Downtown, Los Angeles, California
- 1998 Collective Figurative, Museum Of Arts Downtown Los Angeles, California
- 1997 Contemporary Women Photographers, Scott Nichols Gallery, SF, California
- 1997 Brazilian Contemporary Art, Mission Cultural Center, San Francisco, California

== Selected collections ==
- The J. Paul Getty Museum, Los Angeles
- Los Angeles County Museum of Art, California
- Hammer Museum, Los Angeles
- Griffin Museum, Winchester, Massachusetts
- George Eastman House Museum, Rochester
- Museum of Fine Arts, Houston, Texas
- Musée de l'Elysée, Lausanne, Switzerland
- Musée de la Photographie de Charleroi, Belgium
- Hiroshima Peace Memorial Museum, Japan
- Kiyosato Museum of Photographic Arts, Japan
- Museum of Photographic Arts, San Diego
- Santa Barbara Museum of Art, California
- Perez Art Museum Miami, Miami, Florida
- Milwaukee Art Museum, Milwaukee, Wisconsin
- The Byrd Hoffman Watermill Foundation, New York
- di Rosa Foundation, San Francisco, California
- Buhl Foundation, New York, New York
- Sir Elton John Collection, United Kingdom
- Paul Allen Collection, Seattle, Washington
- Allen Thomas Jr. Collection, North Carolina
- Schwarz Contemporary Art Collection, Berlin, Germany
- Nicolaus von Oesterreich Collection, Frankfurt, Germany

== Books ==
- Kuhn, Mona (2021). Kings Road. Steidl. ISBN 978-3-95829-755-5.
- Kuhn, Mona (2018). Bushes & Succulents. Stanley Barker. ISBN 978-1-9164106-1-9.
- Kuhn, Mona (2018). She Disappeared into Complete Silence. Steidl. ISBN 978-3-95829-180-5.
- Kuhn, Mona (2014). Private. Steidl. ISBN 978-3-86930-709-1.
- Kuhn, Mona (2011). Bordeaux Series. Steidl. ISBN 978-3-86930-308-6.
- Kuhn, Mona (2009). Native. Steidl. ISBN 978-3-86521-913-8.
- Kuhn, Mona (2007). Evidence. Steidl. ISBN 978-3-86521-372-3.
- Kuhn, Mona (2004). Photographs. Steidl. ISBN 3-86521-008-2.

== Awards ==
- The Stieglitz Award (2021)
- The Julia Margaret Cameron Award (2019)
