= Kunsthaus Göttingen =

Exhibition House for contemporary art

Coordinates: 51.5309°N 9.9334°E

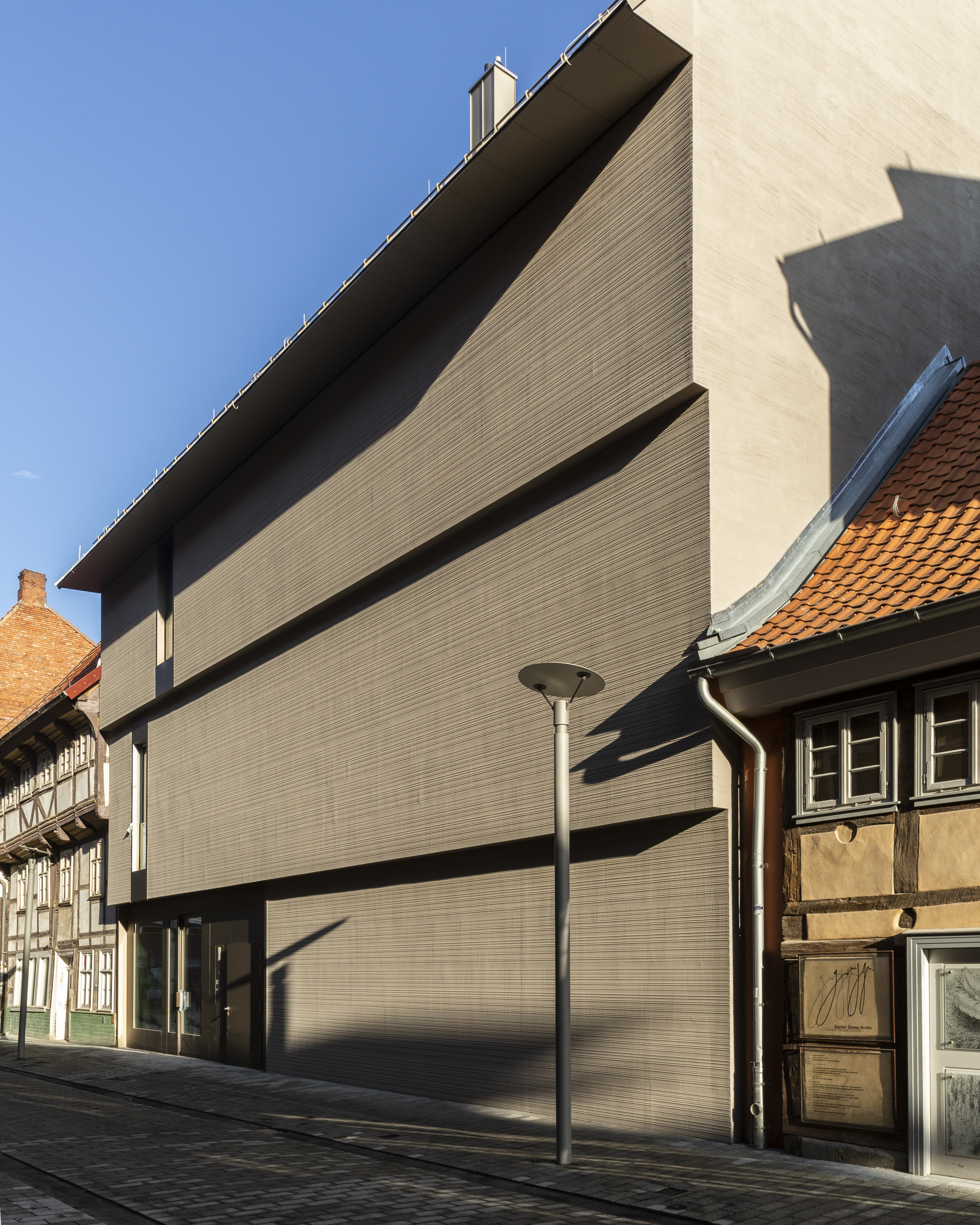
- Facade of the Kunsthaus Göttingen
- Established: 2021
- Location: Göttingen
- Type: Exhibition house for contemporary art
- Directors: Holger Fricke (managing director), Gerhard Steidl (artistic director)
- Website: www.kunsthaus-goettingen.de

Kunsthaus Göttingen is an exhibition space in Göttingen, Germany. Its focus is on contemporary art for works on paper, photography, and new media with an international emphasis. The Kunsthaus is part of KuQua (Kunstquartier Göttingen, Göttingen Art Quarter).

== History ==
The Kunsthaus project was initiated by publisher Gerhard Steidl. and was realized with local and federal government support. The building had its topping out ceremony at the end of September 2019, and was completed in December 2020. The originally estimated total cost was €5,874,000, of which three-quarters was financed by federal funds from the "National Projects of Urban Development" funding program, The final cost was put at "6.5 to 7 million euros" by Göttingen's mayor.

On June 4, 2021, the Kunsthaus opened with a solo exhibition by artist Roni Horn titled Roni Horn. You are the weather.

== Management ==
The start-up phase of the Kunsthaus was managed by Alfons von Uslar as honorary founding managing director from 2020 to June 2022, and by Ute Eskildsen, former curator of the Folkwang Museum in Essen, who advised on building planning and organised the first two exhibitions.

In early 2023 Dorle Meyer took over as Managing Director and Lotte Dinse became head curator. Gerhard Steidl continued to support the house as honorary artistic director.

By late 2024 the Kunsthaus had used up its financial ressources and went bankrupt. However, with the help of continued honorary artistic direction by Gerhard Steidl and financial support of the city the Kunsthaus could recover both financially and as a space for encountering contemporary art.

== Architecture ==
At the end of 2015, after several years of preparations, the city of Göttingen, as the building owner, launched an architectural competition, chaired by Jórunn Ragnarsdóttir, in which 15 architectural firms participated, including two from abroad. The winners of the first prize, architectural studio Atelier30, later withdrew due to artistic conflicts, and second placed Atelier ST from Leipzig were assigned. In 2017, Berlin-based landscape architect Stefan Bernard won the competition for the design of the inner courtyard.

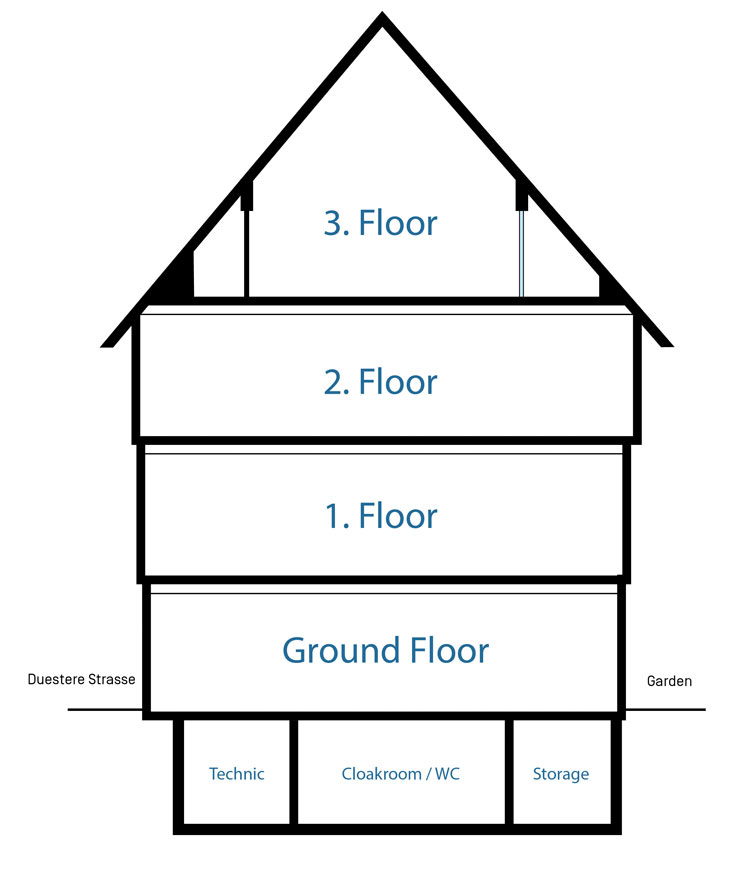
Cross section of the building

The completed, externally three-story Kunsthaus is based on historic Göttingen's half-timbered houses in its closed construction, the building cubature, the gable roof as a roof form, and the floors that project twice toward the top. The linear structure of the horizontal modeling plaster is intended to be reminiscent of "stacked papers".

The courtyard measures around 1,300 square meters. On the south side of the inner courtyard lies the "House of Words" pavilion, which opened shortly after the Kunsthaus in the summer of 2021. Inside is the installation Poet Singing (The Flowering Sheets) by the American artist Jim Dine - donated to the city of Göttingen by the artist.

== Criticism ==
Planning and construction of the Kunsthaus were accompanied by public debates, which manifested in polemics against the initiator Gerhard Steidl and local political criticism of the local SPD ("social democratic self-aggrandizement"), but also included criticism of the architecture ("brutalist imitation of historical timber framing with concrete"). From a cultural policy perspective, there were fears that the Kunsthaus construction project would overshadow other municipal cultural building projects, such as the Municipal Museum.

== Exhibitions ==
The exhibition focus of the Kunsthaus is on current positions of international contemporary art. In average three major exhibitions a year are hosted, accompanied by a nummer of cabinet exhibitions. For the latter the Kunsthaus also uses the neighbouring Grass Archiv, that also holds parts of the private archives of noble laureate Günter Grass.

Selctected exhibitions:

- 2021:
  - Roni Horn - You are the weather.
- 2022:
  - William Kentride, Santu Mofokeng und Banele Khoza- Aus Südafrika
  - Partnering with documenta fifteen, the Kunsthaus opened a group exhibition titled Printing futures from June 18 to September 25, 2022, which presented internationally known artists such as Dayanita Singh, Theseus Chan and Shahidul Alam. Göttingen's mayor Petra Broistedt evaluated the cooperation with documenta as a milestone for Göttingen as a cultural location.
- 2023:
  - Mona Kuhn - A Rudolph Schindler House
- 2024:
  - Emilija Skarnulyte
- 2025
  - Juergen Teller – Auschwitz Birkenau
  - Bryan Adams - #shotbyadams
- 2026 (planned)
  - Jim Dine - A Choir of Poems

A video project by Sebastian Stumpf documenting the building's construction was on permanent display until 2024.

== Support Organisation ==
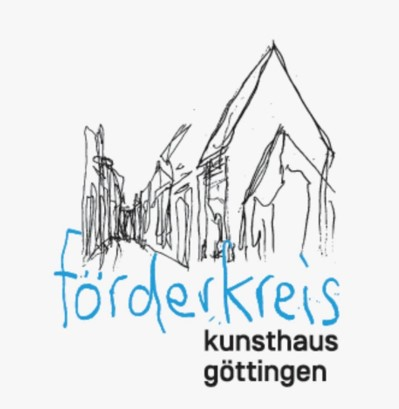

Förderkreis Kunsthaus Göttingen, a registered non-profit association in support of the Kunsthaus, was founded in 2023, initiated by Rolf-Georg Köhler (retired Lord Mayor) and Baron Alfons von Uslar.
