= Sönmez =

Sönmez is a Turkish unisex given name and surname. It may refer to:

- Benyamin Sönmez, Turkish classical musician
- Buğu Sönmez (born 2006), Turkish female handballer
- Burhan Sönmez, Turkish writer
- Doğukan Sönmez, Turkish basketball player
- Fikri Sönmez, Turkish politician
- Hasan Sönmez, Turkish footballer
- Mahmut Sönmez, Turkish-Dutch footballer
- Necmi Sönmez, Turkish-German curator
- Şebnem Sönmez, Turkish actress
- Zeynep Sönmez (born 2002), Turkish tenniswoman
