= Banele =

Banele (Zanele female) is a masculine given name, derived from the Nguni word anele, meaning "enough". Notable people with the name include:

- Banele Khoza (born 1994), Liswati visual artist
- Banele Mhango (born 2003), South African chess master
- Banele Ndaba (born 2002), South African influencer, actor and comedian
- Menzi Banele Ndwandwe (born 1997), South African soccer player
- Banele Sikhondze (born 1993), Liswati footballer
