= George Duncan Beechey =

English painter (1798–1852)

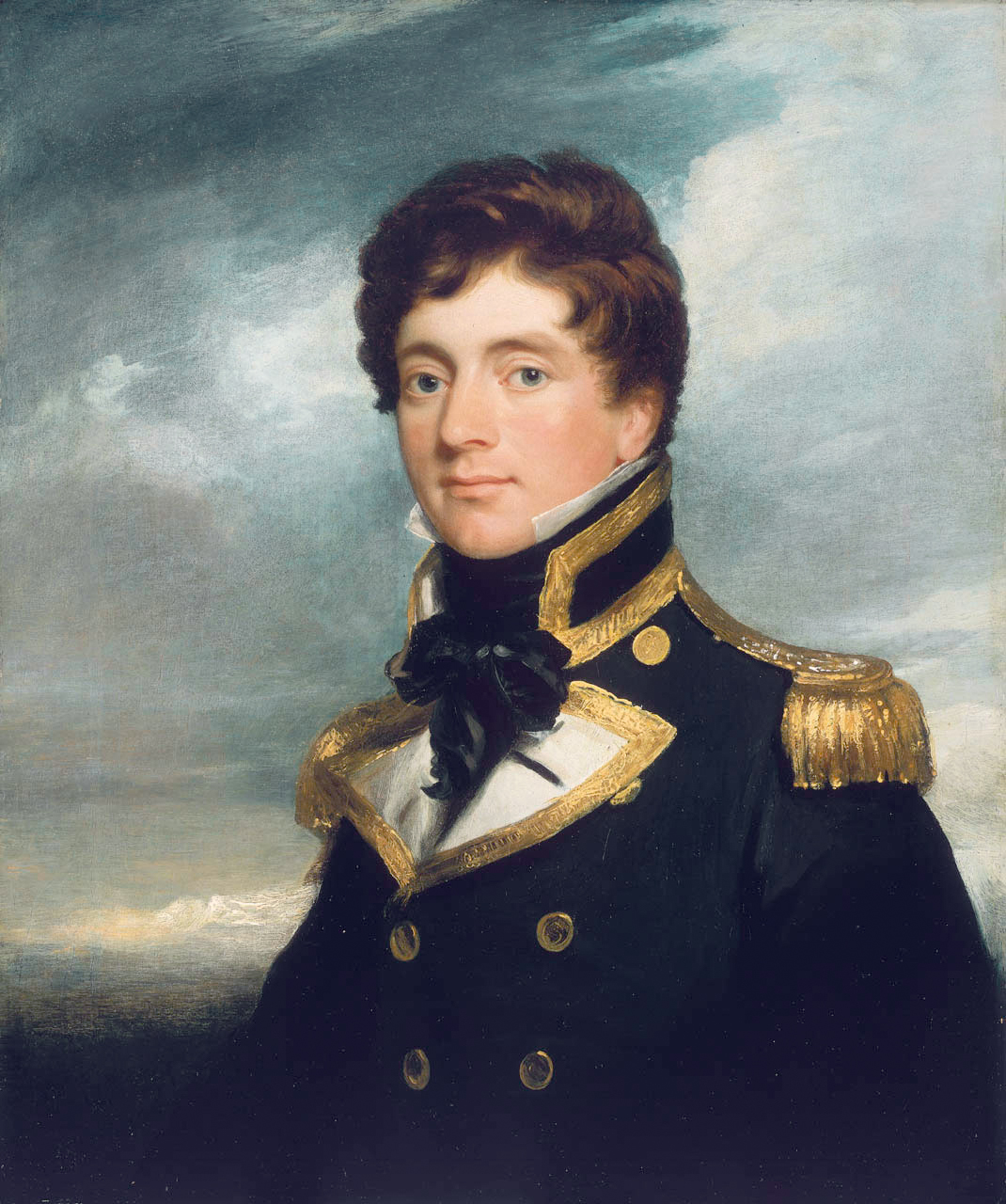
Frederick William Beechey by George Duncan Beechey

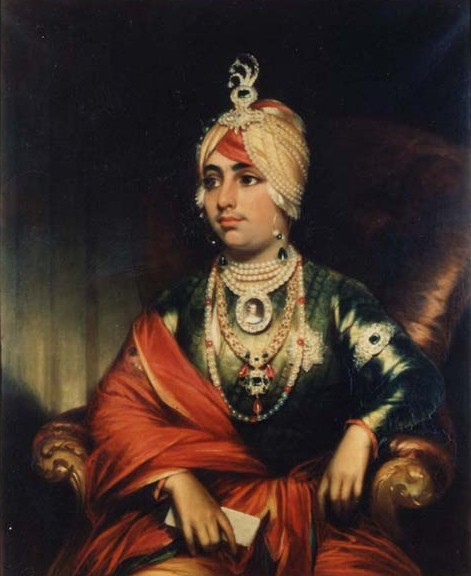
Duleep Singh (1852) by George Duncan Beechey

George Duncan Beechey (1798 – 6 December 1852) was an English portrait painter.

== Life and career ==
Beechey was the fourth child of two painters, Sir William Beechey and his second wife, Anne Jessop. He was a godson of George III. He was the brother of Captain Frederick William Beechey, admiral and painter Richard Brydges Beechey, and the portraitist Henry William Beechey.

His father's position as royal portraitist allowed Beechey to secure portrait commissions from royal circles. His subjects included Prince Augustus Frederick, Duke of Sussex and Bowyer Edward Sparke (1759-1836), Bishop of Chester. Beechey exhibited his paintings at the Royal Academy between 1817 and 1834.

Beechey journeyed to Egypt from 1821 to 1822. In the 1830s, he travelled to India, where he was appointed court painter to the Nawab of Awadh in Lucknow. Beechey held that position until Muhammad Ali Shah died in 1842.

Beechey retired in India and continued to paint. Beechey's paintings are fairly rare; some paintings may have been destroyed during the Indian Rebellion of 1857.
