= St. Vincent Beechey =

British priest (1806–1899)

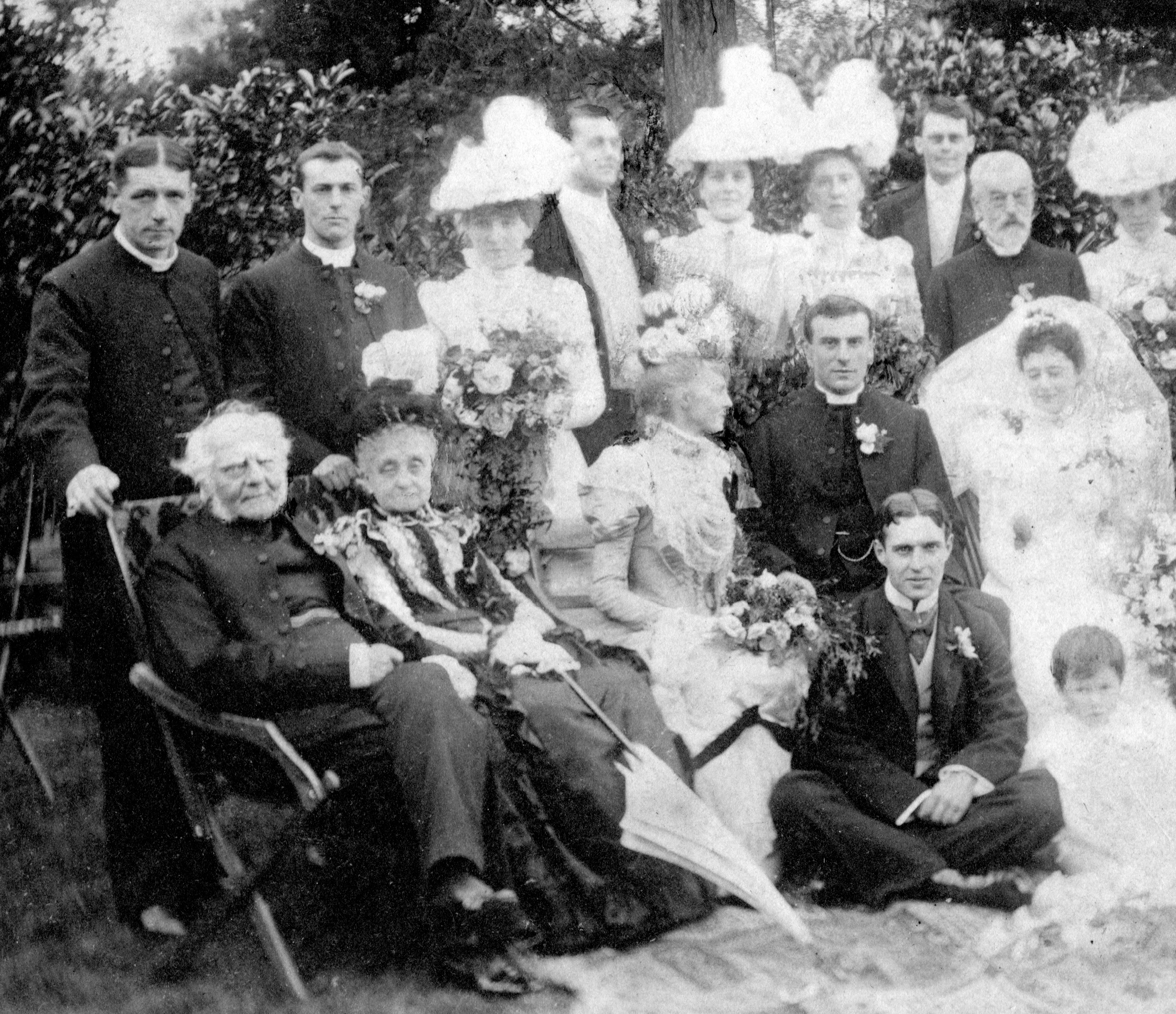
St Vincent Beechey (far left, seated) at the wedding of his granddaughter Mabel Champion Jones, in Camberley, Surrey, on 27 July 1898. Mabel Champion Jones was the daughter of Beechey's daughter Charlotte.

St. Vincent Beechey (7 August 1806 – 19 August 1899) was a nineteenth-century vicar of Fleetwood and Thornton-Cleveleys, Lancashire, and later of Worsley, Lancashire. He is known for founding Rossall School at Fleetwood in 1844, and he was also president of the Manchester Photographic Society. At the time of his death, it was believed that Beechey was the oldest clergyman in England, being 93 years old.

== Early life ==
Beechey was born in London as the twenty-first child of William Beechey, court painter to King George III, and his second wife, Anne Jessop. He was also named after his godfather, John Jervis, 1st Earl of St Vincent, in recognition of his great naval victory in 1797. There is a painting of his godfather by his father. St. Vincent Beechey was also a brother to Frederick William Beechey, the great naval commander, and Richard Brydges Beechey, painter and admiral. He was educated in Sidcup under a Mr. Knowles and at Gonville and Caius College, Cambridge.

Beechey married Mary Ann Ommaney in 1836. They had seven children.

== Appointments ==
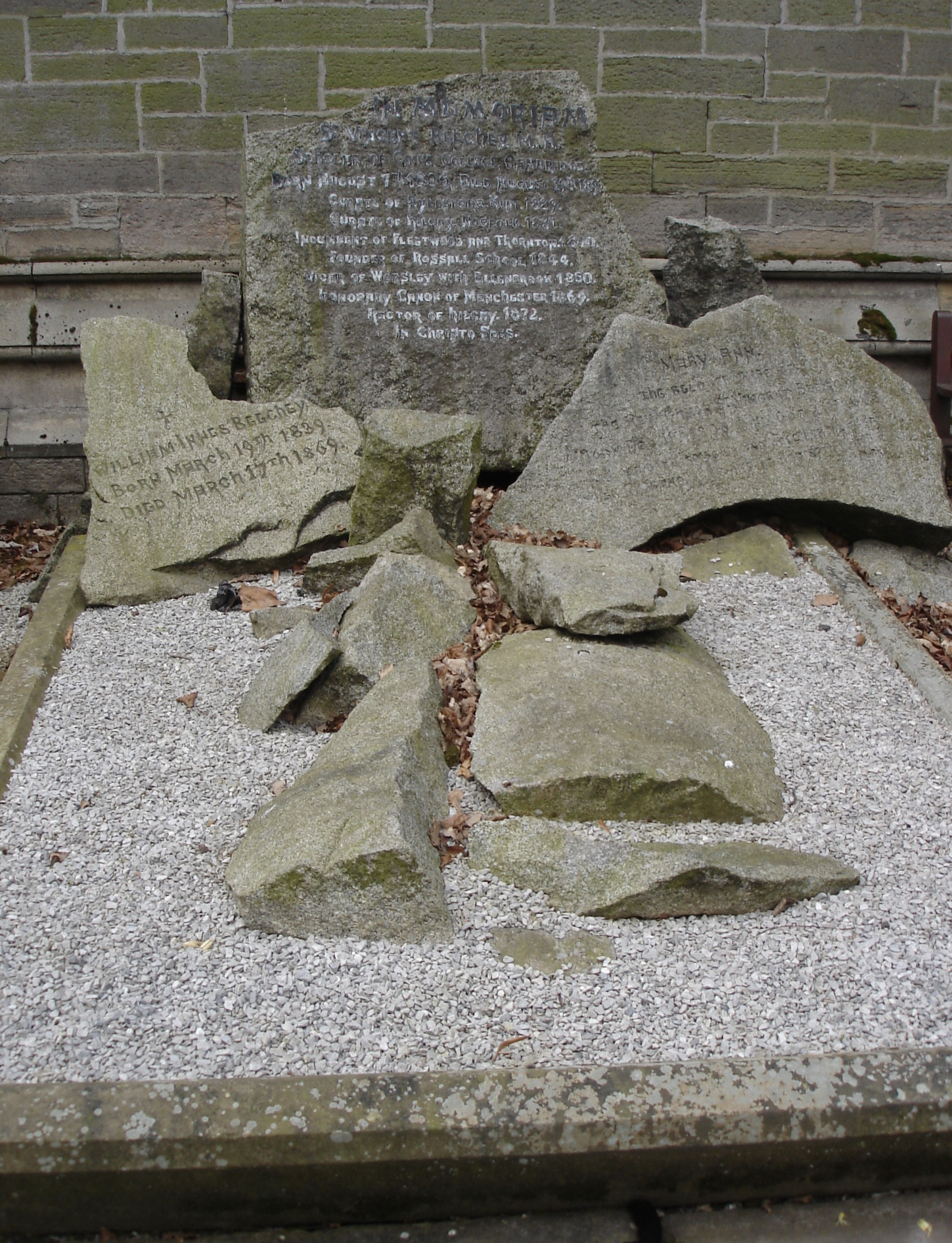
Beechey memorial, St Marks, Worsley

- 1829 – Curate of Aylesford, Kent
- 1831 – Curate of Hilgay, Norfolk
- 1841 - Vicar of Fleetwood and Thornton-Cleveleys
- 1850 – Vicar of Worsley with Ellenbrook
- 1869 – Honorary Canon of Manchester
- 1872 - Rector of Hilgay
- 1876 - Rector of Newton
- President of the Manchester Photographic Society

== Rossall School ==
Beechey was called to a meeting at the North Euston Hotel in 1844 by a young Corsican by the name of Zenon Vantini who was looking to make money through an educational insurance scheme. He had proposed two schools of five-hundred pupils in the Fylde area - one for boys, the other for girls. St. Vincent soon rose to prominence in the scheme when it became apparent that any schools founded would be of Anglican foundation. The idea for a girls' school was dropped and it was decided that a school of 200 students was to open under the name of the North of England Church of England School - this later became Rossall School.

Beechey had to raise funds for the opening of the new school and got the financial support of Peter Hesketh-Fleetwood, The Earl of Derby as patron, the Duke of Devonshire as vice-president and Archbishop Sumner, then Bishop of Chester and later Archbishop of Canterbury, as visitor. The school opened on 22 August 1844 in the grounds of Hesketh's Rossall Hall, with a 21-year lease on the aforementioned property and an option to purchase after ten years for £7000. Beechey remained on the board of governors until 1856 at which point his association became a more informal supervisory one. He continued this role until his death in 1899. His views on the early days of the school can be read in his book - Rossall School Its Rise and Progress. There is a memorial to him in St Mark's churchyard, Worsley, Lancashire.
