= Frideswide Rowland =

Chess composer and chess columnist

Frideswide F. Rowland
- Born: April 18, 1845; Galway, Ireland
- Died: February 25, 1919 (aged 73)
- Occupations: Chess player, writer, composer of chess problems
- Known for: Being the first woman to win a prize as a composer of chess problems; the first woman to edit a newspaper chess column; the first woman to publish a book on chess
- Notable work: Chess Blossoms (1883)
- Spouse: Thomas Benjamin Rowland (m. 1884)
- Father: Richard Brydges Beechey

Frideswide Fanny Beechey Rowland (18 April 1845 – 25 February 1919) was an Irish chess player and writer. She was the first woman to win a prize as a composer of chess problems, the first to edit a newspaper chess column, and the first to publish a book on the game, Chess Blossoms (1883).

== Early life ==
Frideswide Fanny Beechey was born in Galway, Ireland, the youngest daughter of Frideswide Maria Moore Smyth (1819–85), and artist and naval officer Richard Brydges Beechey (1808–95). She was introduced to chess by her father before the age of eight.

In 1884, Beechey married Dublin-born Thomas Benjamin Rowland (1850–1929). They had met following an invitation from the Sheffield Independent to "conduct their chess department in collaboration with Mr. T. B. Rowland". The ceremony in Clontarf was conducted by fellow chess writer Rev. George Alcock MacDonnell, and reported in the Irish Times and the Freeman's Journal. By the time of their marriage, Beechey was already well known in the chess world, described in reports of the wedding as the "British Queen of Chess".

== Chess career ==
In an article for the University of Limerick's History Studies journal in 2005, Timothy Harding described Beechey as "one of the first females to become famous in the chess world". Self-taught as a child through Staunton's Handbook of Chess and games against her father, Beechey began to play regularly during the 1870s when she joined a circle of players in South Devon. She began problem solving and composing in her mid-30s, and during 1880 regularly solved chess problems found in Brief: the Week's News. Her own first published composition appeared there in March that year.

In 1881, Beechey won a prize in an international tourney for problem composers, organised by a Jamaican paper. The following year, visiting Matlock Bath, Derbyshire for her rheumatism and with time to spare, she asked the editor of a local paper, the Matlock Register, whether he would allow her to publish with him. Following his agreement, she became the first woman to produce a newspaper chess column.

Beechey collected her chess problems into a book called Chess Blossoms, which was likely the first chess book published by a woman. In her preface, she wrote that her primary intention was to encourage other women to take up chess problems, "an ennobling, elevating and delightful recreation". She wrote:

That ladies do not generally play chess well is owing not so much to a deficiency of intellectual capacity, as to their sensitive natures, and to the difficulty of concentrating their minds on any subject when in company. For these reasons the composing and solving of problems seem more adapted for ladies than the playing of games.

Page from Chess Blossoms

British Chess Magazine described Chess Blossoms as marking "a new departure in the history of chess literature, heretofore monopolised by hard-headed, calculating man".

Following her marriage, and with the growing popularity of chess leading to more newspapers featuring chess columns, Frideswide and Thomas Rowland had columns in papers including the Irish Sportsman, the Nottingham Guardian, and the Bristol Mercury. Between November 1883 and May 1885, Frideswide also published a chess column in The Science Monthly Illustrated (later The Illustrated Science Monthly). The couple sought to popularise chess, not only through their columns but also through the arrangement of postal chess matches and tournaments. Harding describes them as "masters of chess by correspondence in all its aspects". For some years after their marriage, they ran a social chess club from their home in Victoria Terrace, Clontarf, "notable for its social inclusiveness". Pioneering woman chess player Mary Rudge visited the Rowlands a number of times during the late 1880s and 1890s.

The Rowlands also produced a reference work, The Chess Player's Annual and Club Directory, which went through five editions between 1899 and 1894. In 1893, they moved to Kingstown, and the following year launched a local newspaper, Kingstown Monthly, which featured a chess column by Frideswide and ran for more than a decade. In 1897, readers of her columns in the Weekly Irish Times and Irish Figaro, subscribed more than nine pounds to support her work by buying a typewriter.

In 1905, Frideswide Rowland launched The Four-Leaved Shamrock, a chess paper featuring problems, games, news, and literary material. In 1908, she inaugurated the 'Silver Queen' Irish National Correspondence Tourney, Championship of Ireland, a knock-out tournament which lasted two years. This made Ireland "the first country anywhere in the world to organise a regular national correspondence chess championship". The last issue of The Four-Leaved Shamrock appeared in 1914, with Rowland having to stop due to failing eyesight. She continued her column for the Cork Weekly News until April 1916.

== Death and legacy ==
Frideswide Rowland died at home on 25 February 1919. Her obituary in the British Chess Magazine stated that she "retained her love of chess to the last, and carried on correspondence games until failing sight made it impossible for her to distinguish the pieces".

Noting her influence on subsequent women, such as Devon's Edith Baird and Kate Finn from Cork, Timothy Harding has written:

Frideswide's long career contributed to the development of chess culture and created a loyal community of readers and players on both sides of the Irish Sea. By the time of her effective retirement in 1914, she had truly earned the title of Ireland's Queen of Chess.
