= Necmi Sönmez =

Necmi Sönmez (born May 5, 1968) is a Turkish-German curator, art critic and writer in the field of contemporary art, its international institutions, and exhibition practice. Sönmez has published on contemporary art and visual culture in Turkey, Turkish artists of école de Paris, and gast arbeiter context. He lives and works in Düsseldorf.

== Life and work ==
Necmi Sönmez studied art history, Byzantine art history and classical archaeology in Mainz, Paris, Newcastle and Frankfurt am Main. He gained his PhD in 2001 with a dissertation on "Milch, Blütenstaub, Reis und Wachs. Das Gesamtwerk von Wolfgang Laib" (Milk, pollen, rice and wax. The artistic oeuvre of Wolfgang Laib) at Goethe University Frankfurt with Prof. Stefan Germer and Prof. Manfred Schneckenburger.

From 1994 to 1997, Sönmez worked as an independent curator, initiating and organizing numerous exhibition projects, mainly involving young artists, in Germany, the Netherlands and France. From 1998 to 2000, he was a project assistant at the Museum Wiesbaden and at the MUMOK (Museum Moderner Kunst Stiftung Ludwig) in Vienna.

== Exhibitions ==
He organised the first Nil Yalter (Aksanat, 1994), Jean Dubuffet (1995) and Emil Schumacher (both in the Ankara State Museum of Painting and Sculpture, Ankara) exhibitions in Turkey and presented the work of Candida Höfer (Goethe Institut, Rotterdam, 1996) and Bülent Erkmen (Gutenberg Museum, Mainz, 1997). His first thematic group exhibition Skuplturale Ideen was dedicated to the interdisciplinary artists such as Mathilde ter Heijne, Ulrike Kessl, Tyyne Claudia Pollmann, Joëlle Tuerlinckx, Didier Trenet (Galerie Martina Detterer, Frankfurt, 1998).

From 2001 until the end of January 2005, Sönmez held the post of curator of contemporary art at the Museum Folkwang in Essen, where he curated several exhibitions, projects, presentations including the first institutional museum exhibitions of artists, such as Daniel Knorr (2001), Elisabeth Ballet (2003), Renée Levi (2003), Martin Gostner (2004),Saâdane Hafif, Alexej Meschtschanow (2005). He presented Ulrike Kessl (2001), Surasi Kusolwong (2002) and Mira Schumann (2002) in the cooperation project Museum Folkwang für den RWE Turm. In early 2000 he started to cooperate with the Borusan Contemporary to establish a corporate collection dedicated to the new media art.

From 2006 to 2008, Sönmez was artistic director of the Kunstverein Arnsberg, where he presented artists such as Gregor Schneider (2006), Myriam Holme, Florian Bach (both 2007), Sabine Boehl, Martin Dammann and Anja Cuipka (all 2008). He was member of the Acquisition Committee at FRAC in Franche-Comté (2005-2008). During this period, he started to cooperate with different institutions as guest curator such as Frankfurter Buchmesse, Ca'Pesaro, Elgiz Museum, Yapı Kredi Kültür Sanat.

In 2010, Sönmez was the curator of PORT IZMIR Contemporary Art Triennial, Izmir and the exhibition Unerwartet / Unexpected, Von der islamischen Kunst zur zeitgenössischen Kunst in Kunstmuseum Bochum. After his hybrid exhibition in ISCP, Brookly (2011) and screening project at the KIASMA, Helsinki (2012) he started the series of SPOT ON presentation in the Borusan Contemporary, where he presented artists such as Sol LeWitt (2012), Françoise Morellet (2013), Paul Schwer (2015).

In 2017, he curated the inauguration exhibition SARMAL in Yapi Kredi Kültür the Selim Turan retrospective at the Sabancı Museum.

During the Corona period, he developed in close cooperation with the artist duo :MentalKLINIK and activist-photographer Murat Germen experimental online projects.

He has independently carried out several international cooperation based curatorial projects, residency programs and has worked as an adjunct tutor/curator at different museums among them Tate, Staatliche Museen Berlin, Deutsche Bank KunstHalle, Ruhr Museum, Essen, Antalya Kültür Sanat, Kunsthaus Göttingen and Marie du 10e arrondissement.

== Collaborations with SKIRA, Milan ==
Sönmez started to collaborate with the SKIRA Milan as an advising editor for monographic books about contemporary artists such as

- Belkıs Balpınar (2025)
- Farah Ossouli (2023)
- P. G. Thelander (2019)
- Kemal Seyhan (2018)
- Murat Germen (2016)

== Public projects ==
Necmi Sönmez has been organizing different projects in the public space.

In 2021, he was commissioned by Stiftung Zollverein / Ruhr Museum to create a monument dedicated to the migrant worker / gast arbeiter in the Zollverein Essen.

His research-based projects, such as Sesler, Geceyle Büyenler / Stimmen, Nachtdurchwaches, Stränge (Borusan Sanat Galerisi, Istanbul, 2005), Evrim / Evolve (Izmir, 2018) reflected on the rapid changing conditions of public space in the turkish metropole.

From 2001 until 2005, he has changed the structure of Städtische Galerie Museum Folkwang to the Mobile Städtische Galerie. He has developed an interdisciplinary subversive public art program aimed at forging closer links between theoretical formats and exhibition presentations.

- 2001 “Tische der Kommunikation” (Table of Communication)
- 2002 “Private Öffentlichkeit” (Private Public)
- 2003 “Sukûn / Stille” (Silence, 2003)
- 2004 “Das Erinnerte Haus” (The remembered House)

== Monographies ==
Since 1994, Necmi Sönmez has published number of monographies on artists that function in parallel to his curatorial work including:

- Mehmet Nazım (Siyah Beyaz Ankara, Paris, 2025)
- Tiraje Sözlüğü (Doğan Kitap, Istanbul, 2024)
- İlhan Koman Sözlüğü (Doğan Kitap, Istanbul, 2021)
- Zeid Sözlüğü (Doğan Kitap, Istanbul, 2020)
- Paris Tecrübeleri École de Paris-Çağdaş Türk Sanatı: 1945-1965 (YKY, Istanbul,2019)
- Selim Turan Tez-Antitez-Sentez (YKY, Istanbul, 2016)
- Cengiz Çekil-Bir Tanık (YKY, Istanbul, 2008))
- Turkish Realities, Positions of Contemporary Photography from Turkey, (Kerber Verlag, Heidelberg, 2008)
- Hakkı Anlı PAPKO / Öner Kocabeyoğlu Koleksiyonu (Kitap Yayınevi, Istanbul, 2003)
- Klaus Jürgen-Fischer, "Kunstspektakel - Kunstdebakel. Kunstkritisches Tagebuch, (Salon Verlag, Cologne, 2001)
- „École de Paris et les Peintres Turc“ (Yapi Kredi Yayinlari, Istanbul, 2000)
- Albert Bitran (Aksanat, Istanbul, 1997)
- Mübin Orhan Robert and Lisa Sainbury Collection (Yapi Kredi Yayinlari, Istanbul, 1996)
- Fahr-el-Nissa Zeid (Aksoy Foundation, Istanbul, 1994)

== The Other Modernism ==
Sönmez edited and published comparative books about Turkish art galleries, where the important protagonists of the '70s, '80s, and '90s presented their work:

- Lebriz Koleksiyonu, İki Kuşağın Kırk Yıllık Yolculuğu, Istanbul, 2023
- Bir Galeri-Bir Dönem, Kare Sanat Galerisinin 28 Yılı, Istanbul, 2019
- Görünmeyene Bakmak-Maçka Sanat Galerisi'nin 40. Yılı, İstanbul, 2016

== See also ==
- Turkish art
- Public art
- Curator
- gastarbeiter
- Turkish diaspora
- Other Modernism
