= Zanele =

- Gender: Female
- Language: Nguni languages

Other gender
- Masculine: Banele

Origin
- Derivation: Anele

Other names
- Variant form: Sanele

Zanele is a feminine given name, derived from the Nguni word anele, meaning "enough". Notable people with the name include:

- Zanele kaMagwaza-Msibi (1962–2021), South African politician
- Zanele Dlamini Mbeki (born 1938), South African social worker and former first lady
- Zanele Muholi (born 1972), South African artist
- Zanele Nhlapho (born 1991), South African soccer player
- Zanele Nkomo, South African politician
- Zanele Sifuba, South African educator
- Zanele Situ (1971–2023), South African Paralympian
- Zanele Tshoko (born 1993), South African cyclist
- Zanele Vimbela (born 1989), South African netball player
