= Steidl =

German publishing company

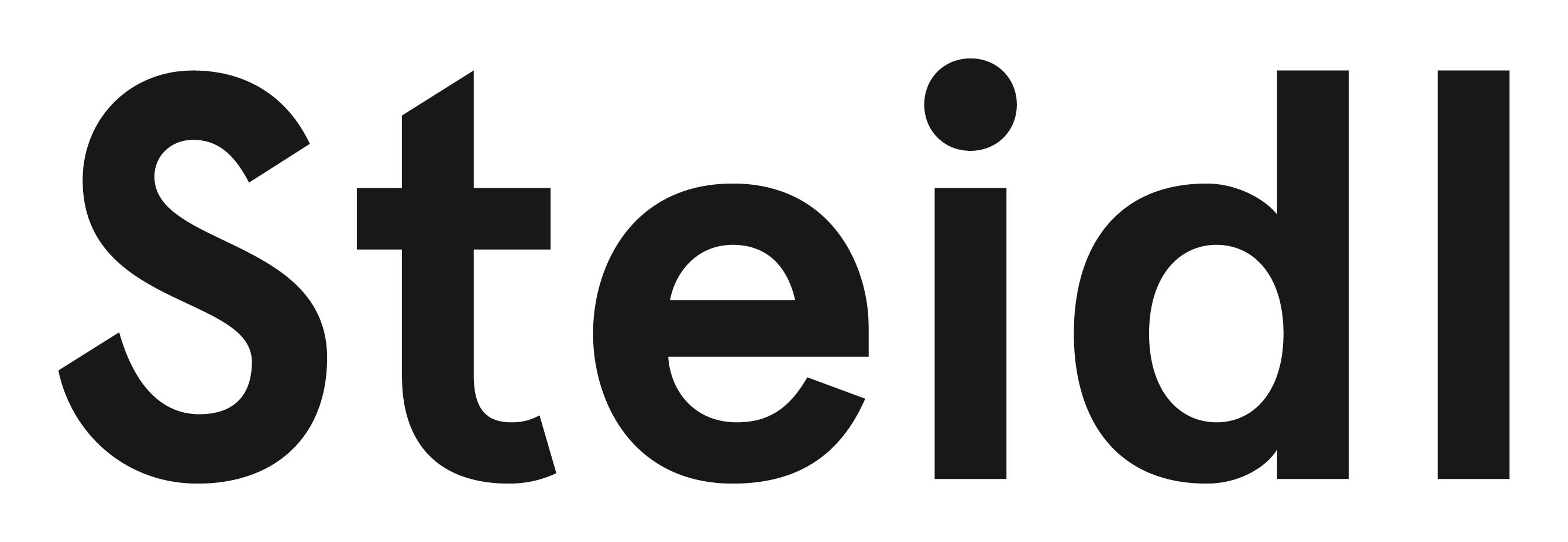
- Founded: 1968
- Founder: Gerhard Steidl
- Country of origin: Germany
- Headquarters location: Göttingen
- Distribution: Mohr Morawa (Austria); AVA (Switzerland); Distributed Art Publishers (US); Interart, SODIS (France); Thames & Hudson (UK)
- Publication types: Books, Photobooks
- Imprints: L.S.D. (with Karl Lagerfeld)
- Official website: steidl.de

Steidl is a German-language publisher based in Göttingen, Germany. Founded in 1968 by Gerhard Steidl, it publishes photobooks.

== Overview ==
The company was started by Gerhard Steidl. The company's first book was Befragung der Documenta (1972).

From 1974, [Gerhard] Steidl added political non-fiction to his program. In the early 1980s, he expanded into literature and selected art and photography books, and in 1989, he published his first paperback editions. [...] In 1996, Steidl finally decided to follow his passion for photography and to start his own internationally oriented photo book program.

Gerhard Steidl still heads the company and is in charge of the production of every book. He endeavours to follow the preferences of the particular photographer for layout, paper, and binding, and insists on working with paper, because of the importance of the feel of the book and the difference between backlighting and reflected light. Printing, binding and all other work is done within a four-storey house on Düstere Strasse in Göttingen.

From 1996, Steidl also specialized in photography. He published the works of photographers such as Robert Frank, Joel Sternfeld, Richard Serra, Bruce Davidson, Arnold Odermatt, Edward Ruscha, Susan Meiselas, Karl Lagerfeld, Saul Leiter, Lou Reed, Martin Schoeller, Juergen Teller and many others. Advertising materials—including catalogues, flyers and invitations to haute couture shows—are produced for Chanel. Steidl and Lagerfeld worked together from the early 1990s until Lagerfelds death in 2019. In 2006, Lagerfeld said that Gerhard Steidl was the "best printer in the world".

The number of titles produced by Steidl is unusually large for an art publisher: about three hundred a year.

Gerhard Steidl produces special editions, but prefers what he calls "'democratic books' or more 'prêt à porter' books", books that can freely be reprinted if the demand for them is sufficient. Steidl held the worldwide rights to the work of Nobel Prize Laureate Günter Grass from 1993 until Grass's death.

From 2009 to 2010, the Musée de l'Élysée (Lausanne) held an exhibition, The Fine Art and Craft of the Steidl Book, Lasting Impressions.

Steidl was the topic of a 2010 documentary, How to Make a Book with Steidl.

== Awards ==
In 2020, Gerhard Steidl received the Gutenberg Prize of the International Gutenberg Society and the City of Mainz. In 2021, Gerhard Steidl received the Award for Photographic Publishing of the Royal Photographic Society.

== Legal issues ==
In 2014, photographer Lawrence Schwartzwald sent 49 signed prints to Steidl for consideration in a proposed book project about New Yorkers reading. The following year, Steidl informed Schwartzwald that the project would not go forward and promised to return the prints, but they were never returned. Schwartzwald sued in a German court, which in 2016 ruled in his favor and ordered Steidl to compensate him €65,000 for the missing works.

Despite the dispute, Steidl later published Schwartzwald’s book The Art of Reading in 2018.
