= Kim McCarty =

Kim McCarty (born February 10, 1956, in Los Angeles, California) is an artist and watercolor painter living and working in Los Angeles, California. Her work has been exhibited in over twenty solo exhibitions in New York and Los Angeles. She often works in large formats using layers of monochromatic colors.

== Career and work ==
McCarty works in a wet-on-wet watercolor technique, normally associated with oil painting, in which the paint is applied to a moistened sheet of paper. She began working in the watercolor medium in 1993, after her studio was destroyed by a fire and was unable to find a space with proper ventilation for oil paint. A 2015 review by Hunter Drohojowska-Philp notes that McCarty is known best for paintings of young, unclothed men and women; it describes her work in that show—images of rabbits and dogs—as unpredictable and spontaneous.

=== Education ===
1988 University of California, Los Angeles, M.F.A. (Master of Fine Arts). 1980 Art Center College of Design, Pasadena, CA, B.F.A. (Bachelor of Fine Arts).

== Professional life ==
=== Solo exhibitions ===
2015

- Maloney Fine Art, Culver City, CA
- Morgan Lehman Gallery, New York, NY

2013

- Kim McCarty Paints, Santa Monica Museum, Santa Monica, CA

2012

- David Klein Gallery, Detroit MI
- Morgan Lehman Gallery, New York, NY

2009

- Lightbox Gallery, Los Angeles, California
- David Klein Gallery, Detroit, MI

2006

- Kim McCarty, cherry and martin, Los Angeles, California

2005

- Kim McCarty, Briggs Robinson Gallery, New York, NY

2003

- Under Glass, cherrydelosreyes, Los Angeles, California
- Watercolors, Santa Barbara Contemporary Art Forum, Santa Barbara, CA
- Kim McCarty, Alysia Duckler Gallery, Portland, Oregon

2002

- Kim McCarty, Rebecca Ibel, Columbus, Ohio
- Kim McCarty, Peter Blake Gallery, Laguna, CA

2000

- Kim McCarty, Recent Paintings, De Chiara/ Stewart, New York, NY

1999

- Kim McCarty, Peter Blake Gallery, Laguna, CA
- Kim McCarty, Ochi Gallery, Ketchum, Idaho

1998

- Drawings, Works on Paper Inc. Los Angeles, California

1997

- Helen, Deanna Izen Miller Gallery, Venice, CA

1996

- Recent Paintings, Sharon Truax Fine Art, Venice, CA

1992

- Recent Paintings, Janie Beggs Gallery, Los Angeles, California

=== Group exhibitions ===
2014

- Watercolor, Griffin Fine Art, London, England
- New York Armory, David Klein Gallery, New York

2012

- Wet, Kim McCarty/Natalie Franks, Eden Rock Gallery, St Barthes,
- New York Armory Modern, David Klein Gallery, New York
- Fresh, MOCA, Los Angeles, California
- Selling Sex Show, studio, London, England
- Twisted Sister, Dodge Gallery, New York, NY

2011

- California Contemporary, Scott White Gallery, San Diego CA
- Inaugural Exhibition, Heiner Contemporary Gallery, Washington DC
- Eve, Subliminal Projects, Los Angeles, California
- Art Platform, David Klein Gallery, Los Angeles, California

2010

- Dis-a-pear, Island Weiss Gallery, New York, NY
- Fresh Figures and Abstraction, Scott White Gallery, San Diego, CA
- View to the Soul, Portraiture Old and New, Heather James Gallery, Palm Desert,
- Medium is the Message, Peninsula School of Art, Fish Creek, WI

2009

- Blue, Blue, Kim Light/Lightbox Gallery, Culver City, CA
- Draw the Line, Lora Schlesinger Gallery, Santa Monica, CA
- Dillitantes, Divas and Dandies, Gavlak Projects, Palm Beach, FL
- Watercolorland, Samuel Freeman Gallery, Los Angeles, California

2008

- Ces Enfants Etranges, Shore institute of the Arts, New Jersey
- Black Dragon Society exhibition, Black Dragon, Los Angeles California
- Contemporary Art, Galerie Sho Contemporary Art, Tokyo
- Artists Portraits of Artists, Pace University Gallery, New York, New York

2007

- Empty Nest, The Changing Face of Childhood in Art, 1880 to the present,
- Nathan A Bernstein Gallery, New York, November 1 to January 12, 2008
- Hammer Contemporary Collection: Part 2, Hammer Museum, Los Angeles, California
- The Unexpected Watercolor, Lee Center for the Arts, Seattle University, Seattle, WA

2006

- 100 artists, 100 watercolors, Jeannie Freilich Fine Art, New York
- August Light, Great Barrington, MA
- Figuratively Speaking, Part 2, Elika Wimmer Gallery, New York, NY
- LA: Now, Dominique Fiat Galerie, Paris, France
- Portrait Show, Pharmaka Gallery, Los Angeles, California

2005

- Contemporary Erotic Drawings, DiverseWorks, Houston, Texas
- Aldrich Museum, Ridgefield, CT
- Liquid Los Angeles: Currents of Contemporary Watercolor Painting Pasadena Museum of California Art, Pasadena, CA
- The Unexpected Watercolor, The Art Gym, Marylhurst University, Portland, OR
- Painted Ladies, William D. Cannon Art Gallery, Carlsbad, CA

2004

- Drawn to the Present, Pace University Gallery, Pleasantville, NY
- What's Doin?, Stephen Wirtz Gallery, San Francisco, CA
- Summer Group Show, Cherrydelosreyes, Los Angeles, California
- New Talent and Familiar Faces, Jan Baum Gallery, Los Angeles, California
- LA Woman, Gallery C, Hermosa Beach, CA
- Expect: Art, Sean Kelly Gallery, New York, NY
- Behind Door Nine, UCSB University Art Museum, Santa Barbara. CA

2003

- International Paper, UCLA Hammer Museum of Art, Los Angeles, California,
- Smoking Pencils Rolling Papers, Black Dragon Society, Los Angeles, California
- The Great Drawing Show 1550–2003, Michael Kohn Gallery, Los Angeles, California
- Wet Paint, Brea Art Gallery, Brea, California Biosystems, USC Institute of Genetic Medicine Art Gallery, Los Angeles, California
- Multiple Expressions, Jan Baum Gallery, Los Angeles, California

2002

- What a Painting Can Do, Hayworth Gallery, Los Angeles, California
- Toyland, Alysia Duckler Gallery, Portland, Oregon
- A Thousand Clowns, Robert Berman Gallery, Santa Monica, CA

2001

- Re-Configuration, Central Academy of Fine Arts Gallery, Beijing, China
- Re-Configuration, Modern Chinese Art Foundation, Ghent, Belgium

2000

- H2O, Works On Paper, Inc. Los Angeles, California
- For Example, Acuna Hansen, Los Angeles, California
- Paintings, Rebecca Ibel Gallery, Columbus, Ohio
- Exhibition, New Jersey Center For The Arts, Summit, NJ
- Certain Things: Unlikely Treasures, Elsa Mott Ives Gallery, New York, NY
- MOCA Auction, MOCA, Los Angeles, California

1999

- Works on Paper, Rebecca Ibel Gallery, Columbus, Ohio
- Traces New Drawing, Katrina Traywick Gallery, Berkeley, CA

1997

- LA Current: A Media Fusion, UCLA Gallery at the Armand Hammer Museum of Art, Los Angeles, California
- The Painted Image, Deanna Izen Miller Gallery, Venice, CA
- Group Exhibition, Sharon Truax Fine Art, Venice, CA
- LA Current: The Female Perspective, UCLA Gallery / Armand Hammer Museum, L.A.

1995

- LA Woman, Lutz Hegenbarth, Cologne, Germany

=== Selected public and private collections ===
- Museum of Modern Art, New York, NY * UCLA Hammer Museum of Art, Los Angeles, California
- The Microsoft Collection, Seattle, WI * Judith Rothschild Foundation, New York, NY
- Latham and Watkins, New York, NY * Neuburger and Berman, Los Angeles, California
- Honolulu Academy of Art, Honolulu, Hawaii

=== Bibliography ===
- Vogue, Irene Neuwirth, index, March 2013
- Huffington Post, Boys and Girls Brings Uncertain Humanity to Morgan Lehman Gallery, November 14, 2012
- Elist Jasmine, Subliminal Projects Gallery "Eve" is all about Female Creation. LA Times. July 28, 2011
- S.R. Leher, Kim McCarty At Kim Light/Lightbox, Los Angeles, Art on Paper, September/October 2009
- Miles, Christopher, Kim McCarty, LA Weekly, April 30, 2009
- Drohojowska-Philp, Hunter, Artist's Pick, Artnews, February, 2006
- Pincus, Robert, "Ladies and Dreamscapes", The San Diego Union Tribune, June 30, 2005
- Genocchio, Benjamin, "Erotic Goes Mainstream" The New York Times, Sunday, May 8, 2005
- Karlins, N.F. "Teenage Tempest", Artnet, Thursday, April 7, 2005
- Lombardi, D. Dominick, "Drawn to the Present", The New York Times, Sunday, October 17, 2004
- Jones, Lesli, "Step into Liquid", Art on Paper, July/August, 2004
- Frank, Peter, "Mark Steven Greenfield, LA Woman," Pick of the week, LA Weekly, May 4–10, 2004
- Wood, Eve, Mojo Rising," Artnet, May 2, 2004
- Pence, Elizabeth, "LA Woman," Artweek, May, 2004
- Green, Tyler, "DC Dairy, Revival of Painting," Artnet, March 17, 2004
- New American Painting, 49th Edition, 2003, (cover)
- El-Diri, Hanadi, "Youth," An-Nahar, Beirut, Lebanon, July 3, 2003
- Mageean, Sean, "The Dreams of Children, New Watercolors, by Kim McCarty," The Independent, June 12, 2003
- Donelon, Charles, "Brutal Youth," Santa Barbara News Press, May 2003
- Frank, Peter, "International Paper," Art on Paper, April 2003
- Chen, Eva, "Artists," Elle Magazine, April 2003
- Dambrot, Shana Nys, "Kim McCarty at cherrydelosreyes," Artweek, March 2003
- Knight, Christopher, "Drawing Not Toeing the Line," Los Angeles Times, February 7, 2003
- Ohlman, Leah, "Teens Stripped of Their Veneer," Los Angeles Times, February 7, 2003
- Fyer-Kohles, Jeanne, "Two Rooms best for vastly different works," Columbus Dispatch, November 2002
- Green, Robert, "Artist Curates," Artforum, April 2002
- Wei, Lilly, "Elsewhere, Everywhere, Here," catalog essay, "Re-configuration," 2001
- Galleries New York, Contemporary Art Report, October 2000
- Kokot, Sharon, "Works on Paper" hardly flimsy," The Columbus Dispatch, June 1999
- Kaplan, Peggy Hall, "Malibu Artist Draws Her Motivation from Experiencing Trial by Fire," Malibu Surfside News, February 11, 1999
- Clothier, Peter, "Inside-Out," catalog essay for Kim McCarty, Works on Paper, Inc. August 28. 1998
- Irmas, Deborah, "L.A. Summer Surf," Artnet, July/August 1998

== External links and additional references ==
- Kim McCarty Art on 1stdibs.com
- Kim McCarty official website
- Newsletter, East Asian Art and Archaeology, Issues 57-70
- San Diego Magazine, July 2005 - Page 239
- Hometown Santa Monica: The Bay Cities Book
