= Naomi Harris =

Canadian photographer (born 1973)

- Born: May 26, 1973 (age 53); Toronto, Ontario, Canada
- Occupation: Photography
- Known for: Road Trip photographer
- Notable work: Haddon Hall Hotel; America Swings; E.U.S.A.
- Website: naomiharris.com

Naomi Harris (born May 26, 1973) is a Canadian photographer living in Toronto. She is known for her portraits of people from sub-cultures such as retirement communities and nudist beaches.

== Biography ==
Harris was born in Toronto and obtained a Bachelor in Fine Arts (BFA) from York University. After completing her degree, she moved to New York City where she received her photographic training at the International Center of Photography. Professionally, several of her personal projects were shot while on road trips, resulting in solo exhibitions and accompanying books. Her work has also been published in the New York Times Magazine as well as the London Sunday Times Magazine, The Telegraph Magazine, Marie Claire UK,, Vice, and Newsweek. Additionally, Harris taught classes at her alma mater, the International Center of Photography.

== Haddon Hall Hotel ==
Harris moved to Miami Beach in December 1999 to begin her first personal project documenting the last hotel in South Beach that catered to senior citizens. She lived there for two months getting to know the residents and becoming a kind of "surrogate granddaughter". The project, called "Haddon Hall Hotel", received the 2001 "International Prize for Young Photojournalism" from Agfa and Das Bildforum in Germany. The photographs underlined how pensioners experienced their lives "in the midst of waiting and boredom, remembering with nostalgia the years they lived." Reproducing the vibrant hues of Miami, the series was described as being offbeat and kitsch in terms of its style.

== America Swings ==
While living in Miami, Harris began photographing people on a nude beach where she also met some swingers. After attending one of their parties, she decided to photograph this subculture. She returned to New York City in April 2002 and began researching the lifestyle. The following year, she shot her first swinger session in Black River Falls, Wisconsin. She went on to photograph more than 38 parties, over a period of 48 months, all across the U.S.

The project was published as the monograph America Swings (2008), edited by Dian Hanson and with an interview by artist Richard Prince.

== Oh Canada! ==
In May 2010, Harris received a grant from the Canada Council for the Arts, allowing her to undertake a road trip across Canada. She traveled along the Trans-Canada Highway, photographing ordinary Canadians and oddities like a giant coffee pot. She began the journey on May 23, 2011 (Victoria Day) in Victoria, British Columbia and ended the trip in St. John's, Newfoundland and Labrador on September 5, 2011 (Labour Day). The cross-country trip, from West to East, allowed her to meet people from all walks of life. She commented that "How we choose to photograph people [has] repercussions. We also have a responsibility to our subjects to share their stories and likeness in a way they would want to be portrayed". The photos were shown in an exhibit at North York Centre in Toronto and covered in Canadian news media such as Maclean's magazine.

== EUSA ==
Regarding issues of cultural appropriation and globalization, Harris's EUSA exhibition took place at the Circuit Gallery in Toronto from August 27-September 19, 2015. The photographs depicted European themed places in America and American themed places in Europe, making it difficult to distinguish between the two continents. Harris photographed a rockabilly festival in Hungary and Viking themed "Danish Days" in California, among other events. Stating that each thematic setting had inaccuracies, Harris added that "it becomes a sentimental and idealized depiction—an homage to a heritage that isn't one's own." An accompanying book entitled "E.U.S.A." was published in 2018.

== 100 Days ==
In 2017, Harris photographed president Trump supporters while driving across the United States for three months. She was on assignment for Vice magazine, beginning her journey in Washington D.C. and driving southwards, then westwards back up to Niagara Falls. She slept most nights in her car in Walmart parking lots and posed many of the subjects while they held her pet dog. What surprised her was that many of the supporters "were less optimistic about Trump and more jaded by the political process as a whole." An exhibit of her "100 Days" photos was held in New York City at the Half King Photography Series gallery.

== Other projects ==
In 2018, Harris undertook another type of journey, this time across Ontario, Canada. Wearing period clothing, she recreated the 19th-century canoe trips taken by painter Frances Anne Hopkins and her travelling companions, local fur traders. Harris helped with the paddling and portage, carrying the canoe on her shoulders across dry land when needed. The art project was funded by a grant from Canada Council for the Arts New Chapter.

== Publications ==
=== Publication by Harris ===
- America Swings. Cologne: Taschen, 2008. Edited by Dian Hanson. ISBN 978-3-8365-0214-6.
  - Taschen, 2010. ISBN 978-3-8365-2228-1. Paperback.
- E.U.S.A. Heidelberg: Kehrer, 2018. Edited by Klaus Kehrer.
- Haddon Hall. Athens: Void, 2021. ISBN 9786185479114.

=== Publications with contributions by Harris ===
- The New Erotic Photography. Edited by Dian Hanson and Eric Kroll. Taschen, 2007. ISBN 978-3-8228-4924-8.
- Image Makers, Image Takers. By Anne-Celine Jaeger. London: Thames & Hudson, 2007. ISBN 978-0500286623.

== Awards ==
- 2001 - Honorable Mention for Yann Geffroy Award presented by Grazia Neri Agency, Italy
- 2001 - Finalist for the W. Eugene Smith Grant
- 2001 - Winner of the International Prize for Young Photojournalism presented by Agfa and Das Bildforum, Germany
- 2002 - One of the "30 Emerging Photographers To Watch" as selected by Photo District News
- 2004 - Represented Canada at the World Press Joop Swart Masterclass in Amsterdam
- 2010 - Recipient of a Canada Council for the Arts Project Grant
