= Frederick William Beechey =

English naval officer and hydrographer (1796–1856)

Rear-Admiral Frederick William Beechey FRS
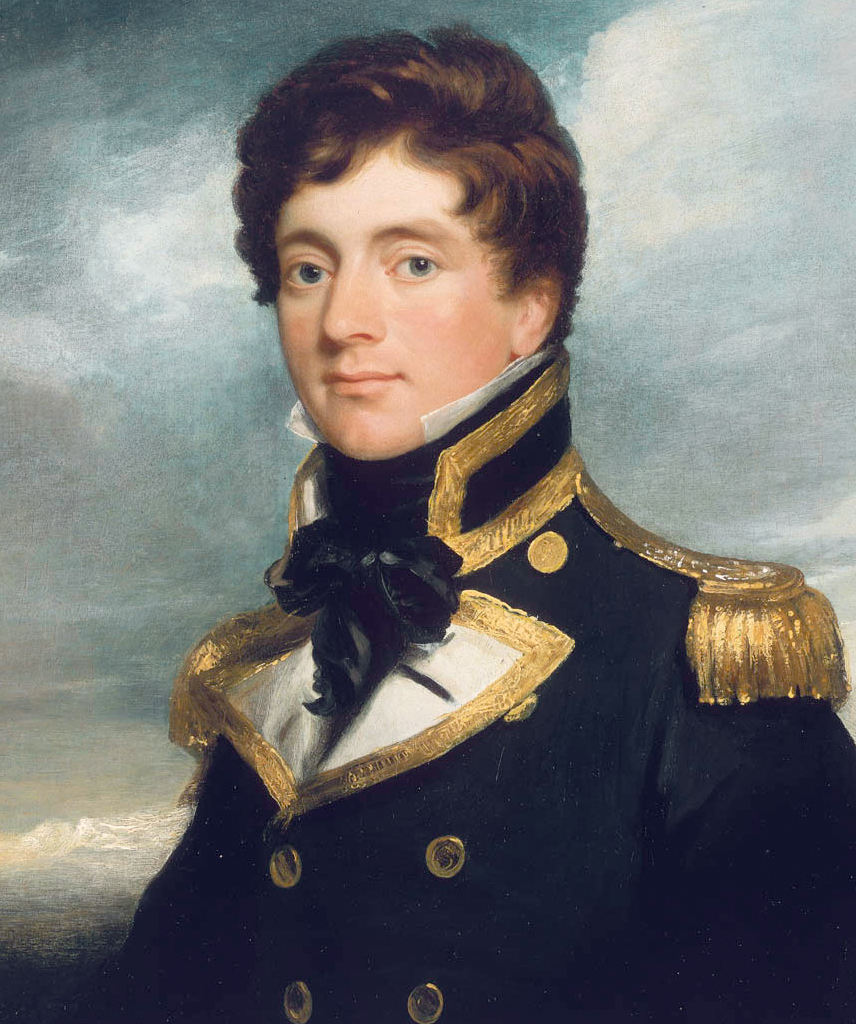
- Beechey painted by his brother George Duncan Beechey

President of the Royal Geographical Society
- In office 28 May 1855 – 29 November 1856
- Preceded by: The Earl of Ellesmere
- Succeeded by: Sir Roderick Murchison

Personal details
- Born: 17 February 1796 London, Middlesex, England
- Died: 29 November 1856 (aged 60) London, Middlesex, England
- Children: 5, including Frances Anne Hopkins
- Parent(s): William Beechey; Anne Jessop

Military service
- Allegiance: United Kingdom
- Branch/service: Royal Navy
- Years of service: 1806–1856
- Rank: Rear-Admiral
- Commands: HMS Blossom; HMS Sulphur; HMS African; HMS Lucifer; HMS Firefly
- Battles/wars: Napoleonic Wars; Battle of Tamatave; War of 1812; Battle of New Orleans

Rear-Admiral Frederick William Beechey FRS (17 February 1796 – 29 November 1856) was an English naval officer, artist, explorer, hydrographer and writer.

== Life and career ==
He was the son of two painters, Sir William Beechey, RA and his second wife, Anne Jessop. Born in London on 17 February 1796, his brothers included the British admiral and painter Richard Brydges Beechey, the portraitist Henry William Beechey and the painter George Duncan Beechey. Frederick entered the Royal Navy at the age of 10 under the command of John Jervis, 1st Earl of St Vincent. He was promoted to midshipman on 8 February 1807 and saw active service during the War of 1812. He served in the Battle of New Orleans. Because of this, he was promoted to 2nd lieutenant on 10 March 1815

In early 1818, and now a lieutenant, Beechey sailed on HMS Trent under Lieutenant John Franklin in David Buchan's Arctic expedition, of which at a later period he published a narrative. In the following year he accompanied Lieutenant W. E. Parry in HMS Hecla, sailing as far north as Melville Island. In 1821, as an officer on HMS Adventure, he took part in the survey of the Mediterranean coast of Africa under the direction of Captain William Henry Smyth. His brother, Henry William Beechey, and he made an overland survey of this coast and published a full account of their work in 1828 under the title of Proceedings of the Expedition to Explore the Northern Coast of Africa from Tripoly [sic] Eastward in 1821-1822.

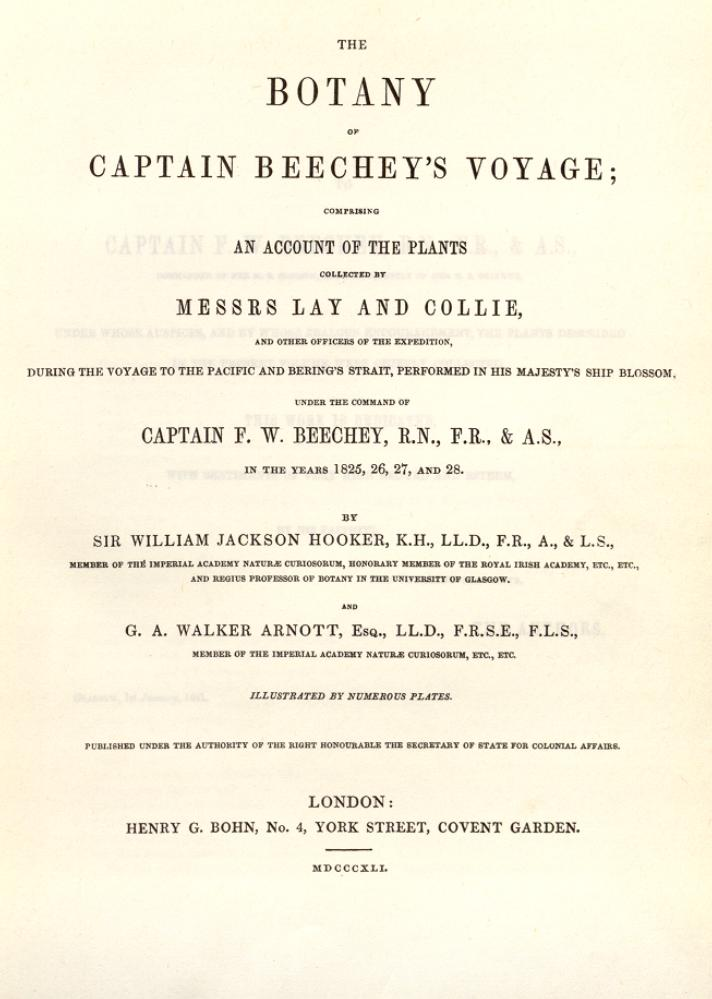
The Botany of Captain Beechey's Voyage, 1841

In 1825, Beechey was appointed to command HMS Blossom. His task was to explore the Bering Strait in concert with Franklin and Parry operating from the east. In the summer of 1826, he passed the strait and a barge from his ship reached 71°23'31" N., and 156°21'30" W. near Point Barrow, which he named, a point only 146 miles west of that reached by Franklin's expedition from the Mackenzie River. The whole voyage lasted more than three years, and in the course of it, Beechey discovered several islands in the Pacific, and an excellent harbour near Cape Prince of Wales.

In 1826, he visited a Catholic mission in California. He wrote, "...with whips, canes and goads or sharp, pointed sticks to preserve silence and maintain order, and what seemed more difficult than either, to keep the congregation in their kneeling posture. The goads would reach a long way and inflict a sharp puncture without making any noise. The end of the church was occupied by a guard of soldiers under arms with fixed bayonets."

In July 1826, he named the three islands in the Bering Strait. Two were the Diomede Islands that Vitus Bering had named in 1728: "Ratmanoff Island" (Big Diomede) and "Krusenstern Island" (Little Diomede). Beechey called the uninhabited third islet "Fairway Rock", which is still its contemporary name. One of his crew, Petty Officer John Bechervaise, gave a detailed account of the voyage in his Thirty-six Years of a Seafaring Life by an Old Quartermaster, published privately in 1839. (The crewmember's namesake and great-great-grandson John Béchervaise (1910–1998) was a noted explorer of Antarctica.) In 1831, there appeared Beechey's Narrative of a Voyage to the Pacific and Bering's Strait to Co-operate with the Polar Expeditions, 1825-1828.

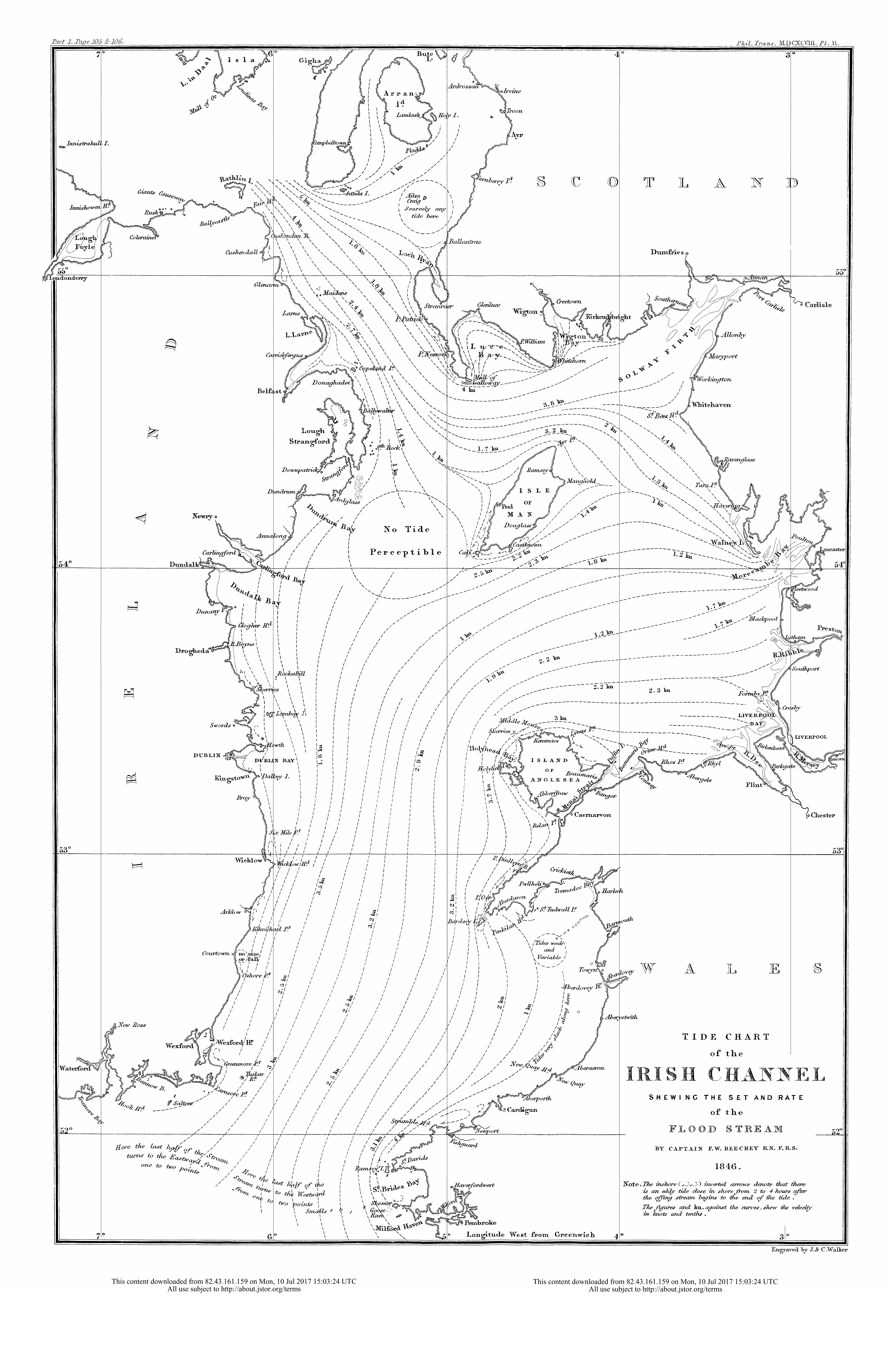
Beechey Tidal Chart of the Irish Channel, dated 1846

In 1835 and '36, Captain Beechey was employed on the coast survey of South America, and from 1837 to 1847, carried on similar work along the Irish coasts, and in the North Sea and English Channel. He carried out detailed tidal surveys during this period, which were published, with charts, in two Royal Society papers in 1848 and 1851. This was the first published work of its kind since Edmond Halley's tidal chart appeared in about 1702. He was appointed in 1850 to preside over the Marine Department of the Board of Trade.

In 1854, he was made rear admiral, and in the following year was elected president of the Royal Geographical Society.

Beechey Island, where Sir John Franklin wintered, was named by him after his father.

== Family of painters ==
His daughter was painter Frances Anne Hopkins, who lived in Canada for 12 years and painted many scenes of canoe travel.

His parents and three of his brothers were painters: admiral and painter Richard Brydges Beechey, portraitist Henry William Beechey, and portraitist George Duncan Beechey.

== See also ==
- Beaufort's Dyke
- European and American voyages of scientific exploration

== Publications ==
- — (1828). Proceedings of the Expedition To Explore The Northern Coast of Africa, From Tripoly Eastward; In MDCCCXXI and MDCCCXXII Comprehending An Account of The Greater Syrtis And Cyranaeica. London: John Murray. Gutenberg
- — (1832). Narrative Of A Voyage To The Pacific And Beering's Strait, To Co-Operate With The Polar Expeditions Performed In His Majesty's Ship Blossom, Under The Command Of Captain F. W. Beechey, R. N. In The Years 1825, 26, 27, 28. Philadelphia: Carey & Lea.
- — (1843). A Voyage Of Discovery Towards The North Pole, Performed In His Majesty's Ships Dorothea And Trent, Under The Command Of Captain David Buchan, R. N., 1818. London: Richard Bentley.
- — (1848). "Report of Observations Made Upon the Tides in the Irish Sea, and Upon the Great Similarity of Tidal Phenomena of the Irish and English Channels, and the Importance of Extending the Experiments Round the Land's End and up the English Channel. Embodied in a Letter to the Hydrographer". Philosophical Transactions of the Royal Society of London. 138: 105–116. doi:10.1098/rstl.1848.0006. JSTOR 108287.
- — (1850). "Report of Further Observations Made upon the Tidal Streams of the English Channel and German Ocean, under the Authority of the Admiralty, in 1849 and 1850". Abstracts of the Papers Communicated to the Royal Society of London. 6: 68–70. doi:10.1098/rspl.1850.0024.
- — (1851). "Report of Further Observations upon the Tidal Streams of the North Sea and English Channel, with Remarks upon the Laws by Which Those Streams Appear to be Governed". Philosophical Transactions of the Royal Society of London. 141: 703–718. doi:10.1098/rstl.1851.0034. JSTOR 108420.
- —; Bershad, Sonia S (1980). "The Drawings and Watercolours". Arctic. 33 (1): 117–167. doi:10.14430/arctic2551. JSTOR 40509279.
