= Beachy =

Beachy is a surname of Amish origin. Notable people with the surname include:

- Brandon Beachy, Atlanta Braves baseball player
- Israel Beachy, bassist in Christian rock band
- Moses M. Beachy, the founding bishop of the Beachy Amish Mennonite churches in 1927
- Philip A. Beachy, professor of molecular biology
- Robert M. Beachy, historian
- Roger N. Beachy, molecular biologist
- Stephen Beachy, writer

== See also ==
- Lincoln Beachey, aviator
- Beechy, a village Saskatchewan, Canada

Christopher Beachy, past President of the American Society of Ichthyologists and Herpetologists'; also, Department Head of Biological Sciences, Southeastern Louisiana University 2013-2022
