= Richard Brydges Beechey =

Anglo-Irish painter and admiral

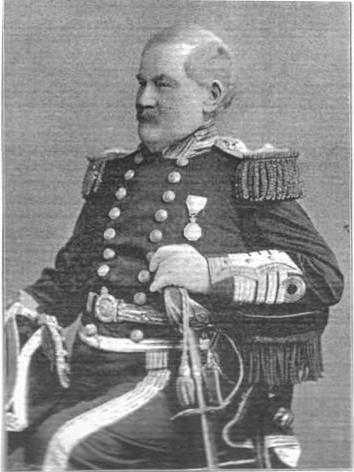
Richard Brydges Beechey

Richard Brydges Beechey (1808 – 8 March 1895) was an Anglo-Irish painter and admiral in the Royal Navy.

== Early life ==
Beechey was born to two British painters, Sir William Beechey and his second wife, Anne Jessop. His brothers included the British sea captain and painter Frederick William Beechey, the portraitist Henry William Beechey and the painter George Duncan Beechey.

Beechey joined the Royal Navy at the age of 14, and he eventually rose to the rank of admiral. Like his father and some of his brothers, he was a celebrated painter, who illustrated various ports and naval scenes.

== Career ==
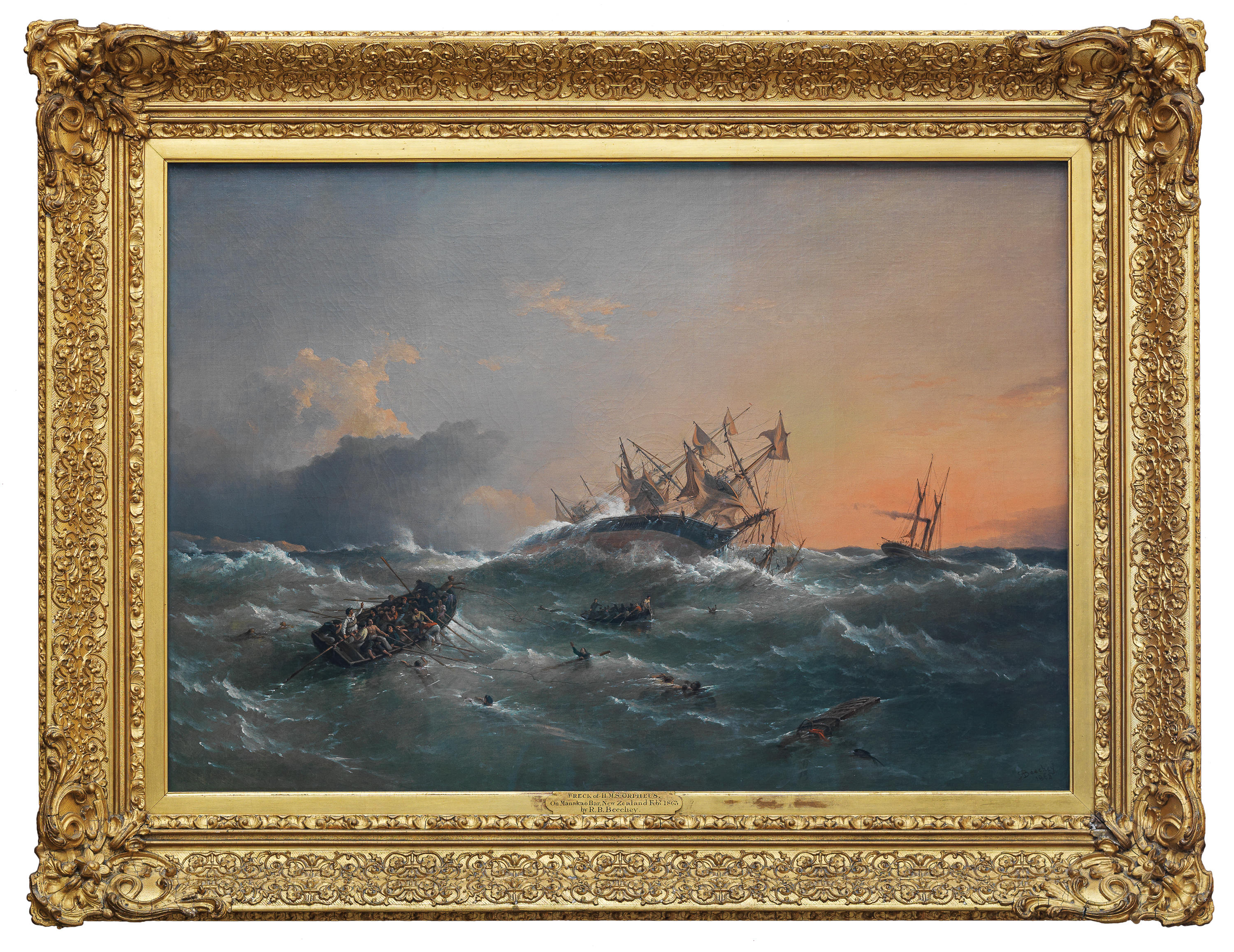
HMS Orpheus, by Richard Brydges Beechey, 1863.

After the Royal Naval College, Portsmouth, Beechey sailed in HMS Blossom, commanded by his brother Frederick William Beechey, into the Pacific, and then to the Bering Strait to attempt to support the Franklin Expedition. He was promoted lieutenant in 1828. Then he served in the Mediterranean, and in 1835 was seconded to a survey of Ireland. He was made commander in 1846, and then in 1851 was promoted captain. In 1879, long after the end of his active naval career, he was promoted to the rank of vice-admiral on the retired list.

After his retirement from the navy in 1864, he settled in Ireland, living for many years at Monkstown, and later in Pembroke Road, Dublin. He regularly exhibited paintings of maritime subjects at the Royal Hibernian Academy, of which was made an honorary member in 1868. In about 1877, he settled at Plymouth.

== Family ==
In 1844, he married Frideswide Maria Moore Smyth (1819–1885) of Portlick Castle, Westmeath. They had two daughters, Annie L. Beechey and Frideswide F. Beechey (1851–1919). In 1882, his daughter Frideswide was the first woman to win a prize as a composer of chess problems. Her book Chess Blossoms was published in 1883, followed by Chess Fruits in 1884, which she co-wrote with her husband, Thomas B. Rowland.

In 1888, some three years after the death of his first wife, Beechey married Frances, daughter of the Rev. Annesley Stewart of Trinity College Dublin.

== Death ==
Beechey died at 9 Portland Terrace, Southsea, on 8 March 1895.
