= Banele Khoza =

Swazi artist working in South Africa

Banele Khoza (born 1994) is visual artist was born in Hlatikulu, Swaziland (now Eswatini). He has been living and working from South Africa since 2012, where his relatively young art career has been receiving wide acclaim.

== Background ==
Khoza spent his formative years in his homeland of Swaziland, before moving to South Africa as a fourteen year old teenager and where he continues to live. After completing his matric, or secondary school education, he enrolled at the London International School of Fashion for a year. Upon his return, he decided to pursue Fine Arts at Tshwane University of Technology in Pretoria, South Africa. He taught drawing at the same institution, but later on quit to work as a full time artist.

== Art career ==
Since finishing university, Khoza has been part of a vanguard of visual artists making a wave in southern Africa. Garnering so much critical attention, earning international residencies, and getting his work collected worldwide catapulted Khoza's career much quicker than most of his generation. He has participated in group shows, and has now had a string of solo shows in South Africa, but his footprint is spreading far and wide, as he is increasingly getting popular in the European art market. He now runs an independent gallery, Bkhz, situated in Rosebank, a leafy suburb in Johannesburg, South Africa. Khoza is an artist of tender subjects and deeply affective.

== Exhibitions ==
'27' Bkhz, Johannesburg, 2021

LOVE? Smith Studio, Cape Town, 2018

LGBQTI+: Banele Khoza, Zeitz MOCAA, Cape Town, 2018

Lovely Nights, Lizamore Gallery, Randburg, 2017

Temporary Feeling, Pretoria Art Museum, Pretoria, 2016
