= Gerhard Steidl =

German printer and publisher

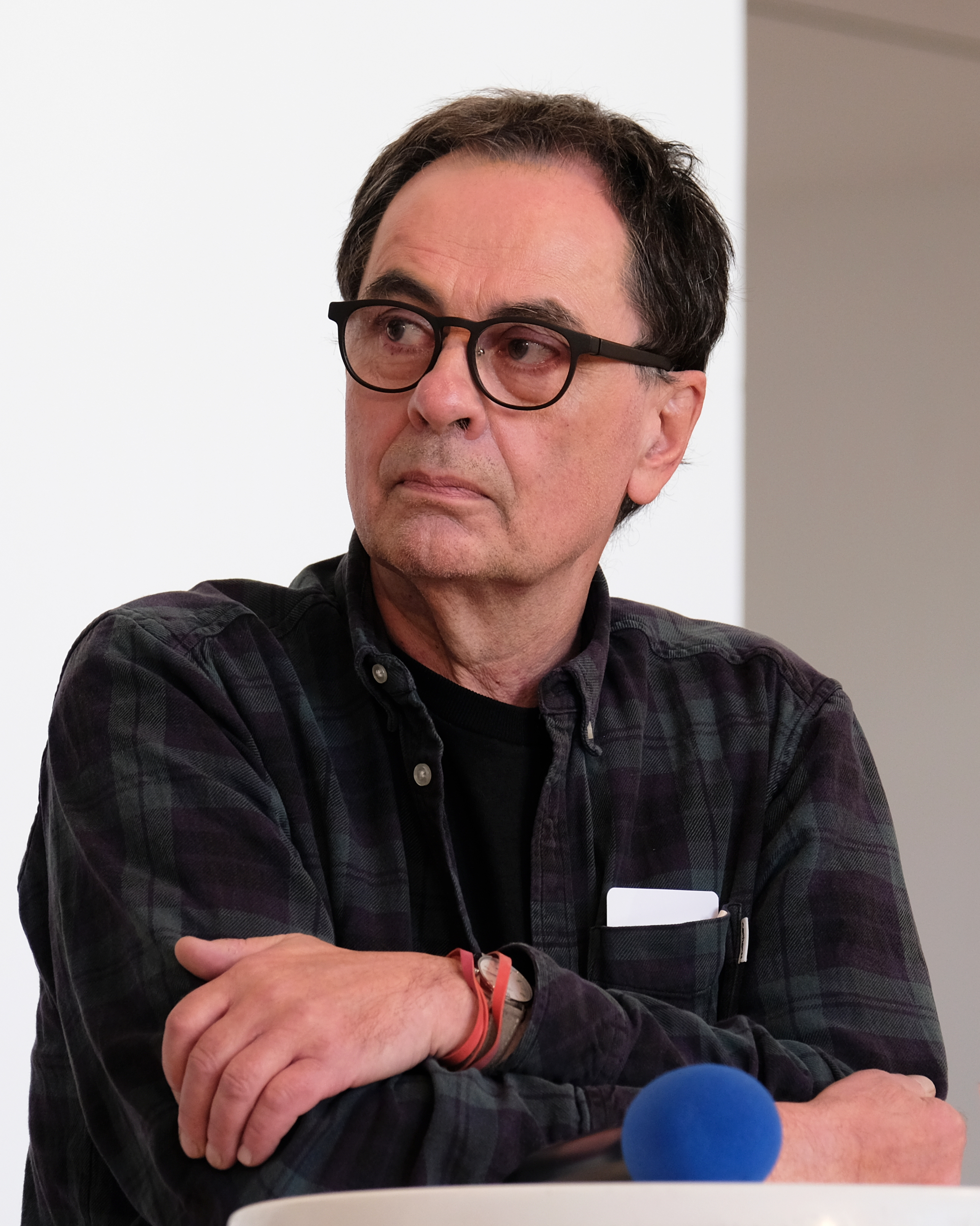
Gerhard Steidl (2022)

Gerhard Steidl (born 1950) is a German printer and publisher. He is the founder of the publishing company Steidl. In 2020, he was awarded the Gutenberg Prize of the International Gutenberg Society and the City of Mainz.

== Life and work ==
Gerhard Steidl was born and grew up in Göttingen, Germany. His father was a cleaner in the presses of the local newspaper where Steidl developed an interest in the technical aspects of printing from an early age. His impetus for a career in printing came when, as a teenager, one of his photographs was used in a poster advertising a production of Brecht's Mann ist Mann. The printing company did what the boy thought was a poor job; he suggested printing the sheet twice, the company agreed to do so in order to get rid of him, and his idea worked fairly well.

In the late 1960s, Steidl established the Steidl printing company in Göttingen, which, following the bankruptcy of the publisher Scalo, came to publish photobooks. He also owns a guest house called the Halftone Hotel where each room is named for an artist printed by his company.

In 2020, Gerhard Steidl received the Gutenberg Prize of the International Gutenberg Society and the City of Mainz.

== Films ==
- How to Make a Book with Steidl (2010) – documentary about Steidl
