= Anne Beechey =

British portrait painter (1764–1833)

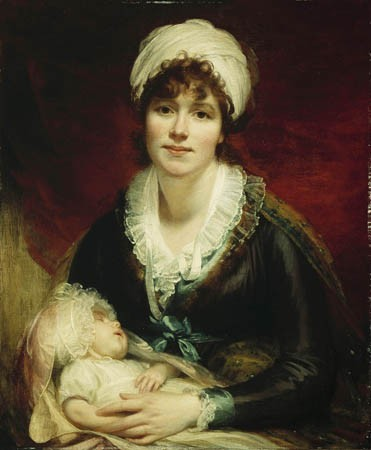
- Born: Anne Phyllis Jessop; 3 August 1764; Thorpe St Andrew
- Died: 14 December 1833 (aged 69); Harley Street
- Known for: Painting
- Spouse: Sir William Beechey
- Children: 10

Anne, Lady Beechey (born Anne Phyllis Jessop; 3 August 1764 – 14 December 1833) was a British portrait painter.

== Life ==
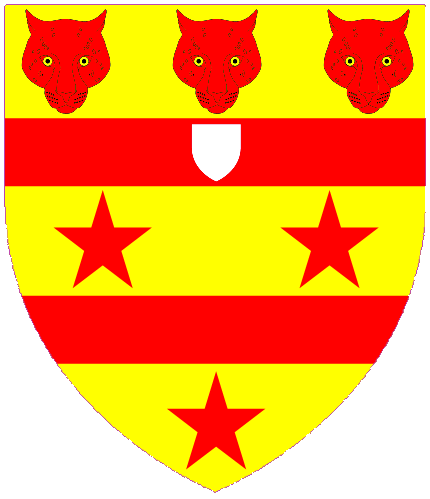
Anne's arms granted in 1829: Or between two bars as many mullets Gules in chief three leopards faces and in base a mullet of the last.

Beechey was born in Thorpe St Andrew near Norwich, Norfolk, in 1764 as Anne Phyllis Jessop. She developed a successful portrait business and she met William Beechey who was also a painter. William was in Norwich between 1782 and 1787 and it presumed they met at that time. In 1787 she exhibited works at the Royal Academy as "Miss A. P. Jessup"(sic).

William was a widower in 1793 with five children after his first wife, Mary Ann, died. Beechey and Jessop wed in 1793. She continued to exhibit at the Royal Academy from 1795 to 1805. She used the name Mrs Beechey until 1799, when she became Lady Beechey.

=== Children ===
1. Anne Phyllis Beechey (1794–December 1883)
2. Frederick William Beechey (1796–1856), Royal Navy captain, geographer, politician
3. George Duncan Beechey (1798–1852), painter
4. Anna Dodsworth Beechey (born 1800)
5. William Nelson Beechey (3 August 1801 – 1 August 1878)
6. Charlotte Earl Beechey (3 August 1801 – 28 November 1849)
7. Alfred Beechey (born 24 June 1803)
8. St. Vincent Beechey (1806–1899), clergyman
9. Richard Brydges Beechey (1808–1895), painter and admiral in the British navy
10. Jane Henrietta Frances Beechey (born 19 December 1809)

Their children included a high number of notable painters. Beechey died in Harley Street.
