= Henry William Beechey =

English painter and explorer

- Born: 1788 or 1789
- Died: 1862
- Father: William Beechey

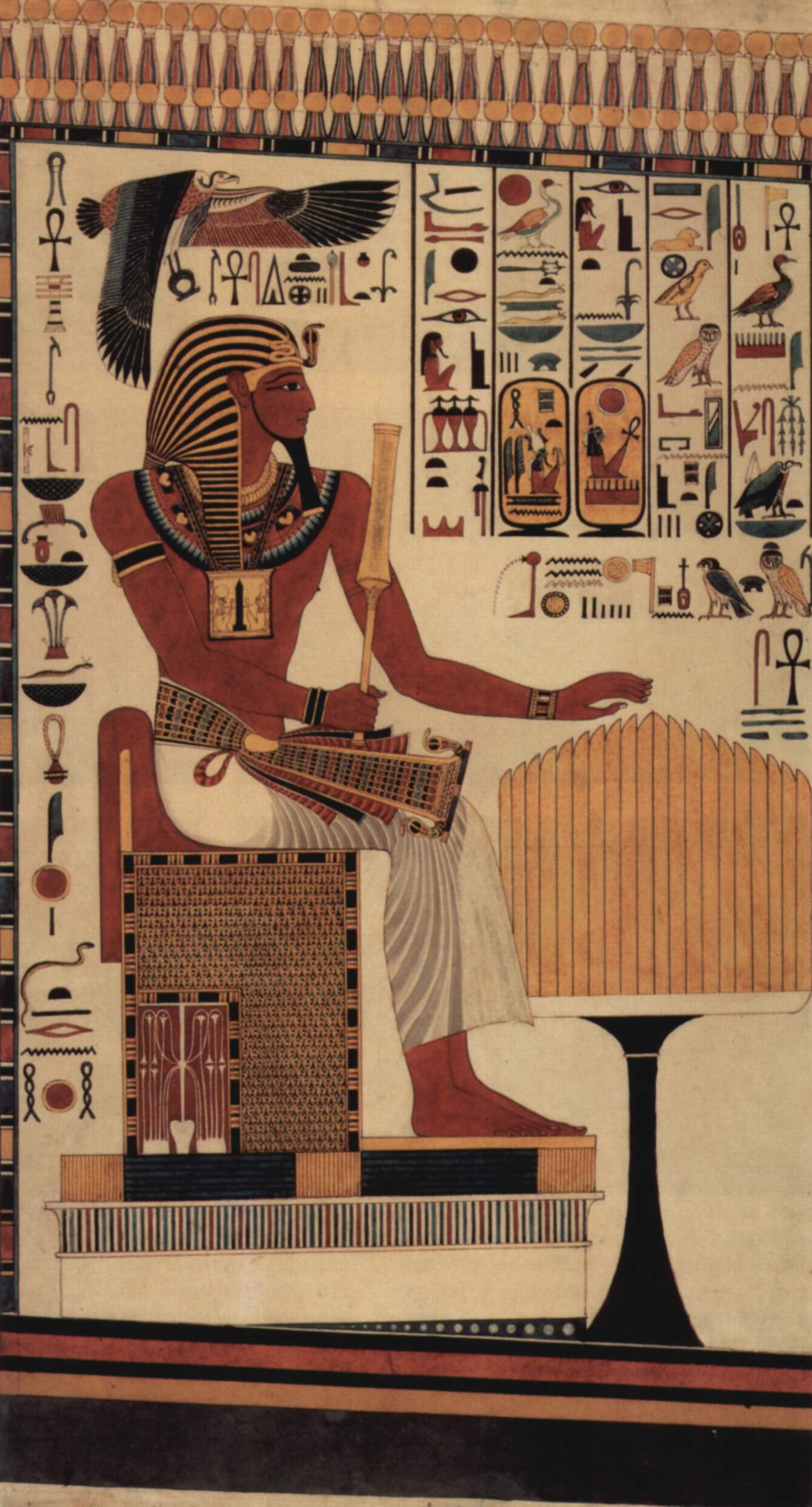
Copy of a mural painting from the grave of Seti I, made by Beechey c. 1818, and now in the British Museum

Henry William Beechey (1788/89 – 4 August 1862) was an English painter and explorer. His father was the painter Sir William Beechey, RA and his stepmother was Anne Jessop. He followed his father's profession. He sent a marine subject to the Royal Academy in 1829, and another in 1838 to the British Institution.

== Life and career ==
Beechey was born in 1789 or 1790. His mother, his father's first wife, had five children before her death. Beechey was brought up by his father William Beechey and his second wife, Anne Jessop. Both his father and stepmother were painters, and they married in 1793. They had many children together, and several of these would be notable painters. Beechey trained at the Royal Academy.

Some time before 1816, he had become secretary to Henry Salt, the British consul-general in Egypt, and at the latter's request accompanied Giovanni Belzoni in that and the following year beyond the second cataract, for the purpose of studying and making designs of the fine monuments existing at Thebes. In the laborious excavation of the temple of Ipsambul, Beechey took his share; he also copied the paintings, in the king's tombs in the valley of Biban-el-Muluk, which had lately been opened by Belzoni.

In common with Salt, Beechey had much to endure from Belzoni's suspicious and jealous nature (Life and Correspondence of Henry Salt, ed. Halls, volume ii.) About 1820 he returned to England, and the next year was appointed by Earl Bathurst, on the part of the colonial office, to examine and report on the antiquities of the Cyrenaica, his brother, Captain Beechey, having been detached to survey the coast-line from Tripoli to Derna. The results of this expedition, which occupied the greater part of the years 1821 and 1822, were chronicled in a journal kept by the brothers, to which Henry Beechey added numerous drawings, illustrative of the art and natural peculiarities of the classic region they were exploring, many of which were left out when the narrative came to be published in 1828.

Of the remainder of Beechey's life there is little record. He had seen much vicissitude, and in 1851 emigrated to New Zealand, where he died in 1862. He left a family. Besides his share in the above-mentioned work Beechey wrote a painstaking memoir of Sir Joshua Reynolds, prefixed to the edition of the latter's Literary Works, published in 2 vols. octavo, London, 1835, and afterwards reprinted in Bohn's Standard Library edition, 2 vols. octavo, London, 1852.

Beechey became a fellow of the Society of Antiquaries in 1825. (Note: Family information.)
