= For Farewell of Nostalgia =

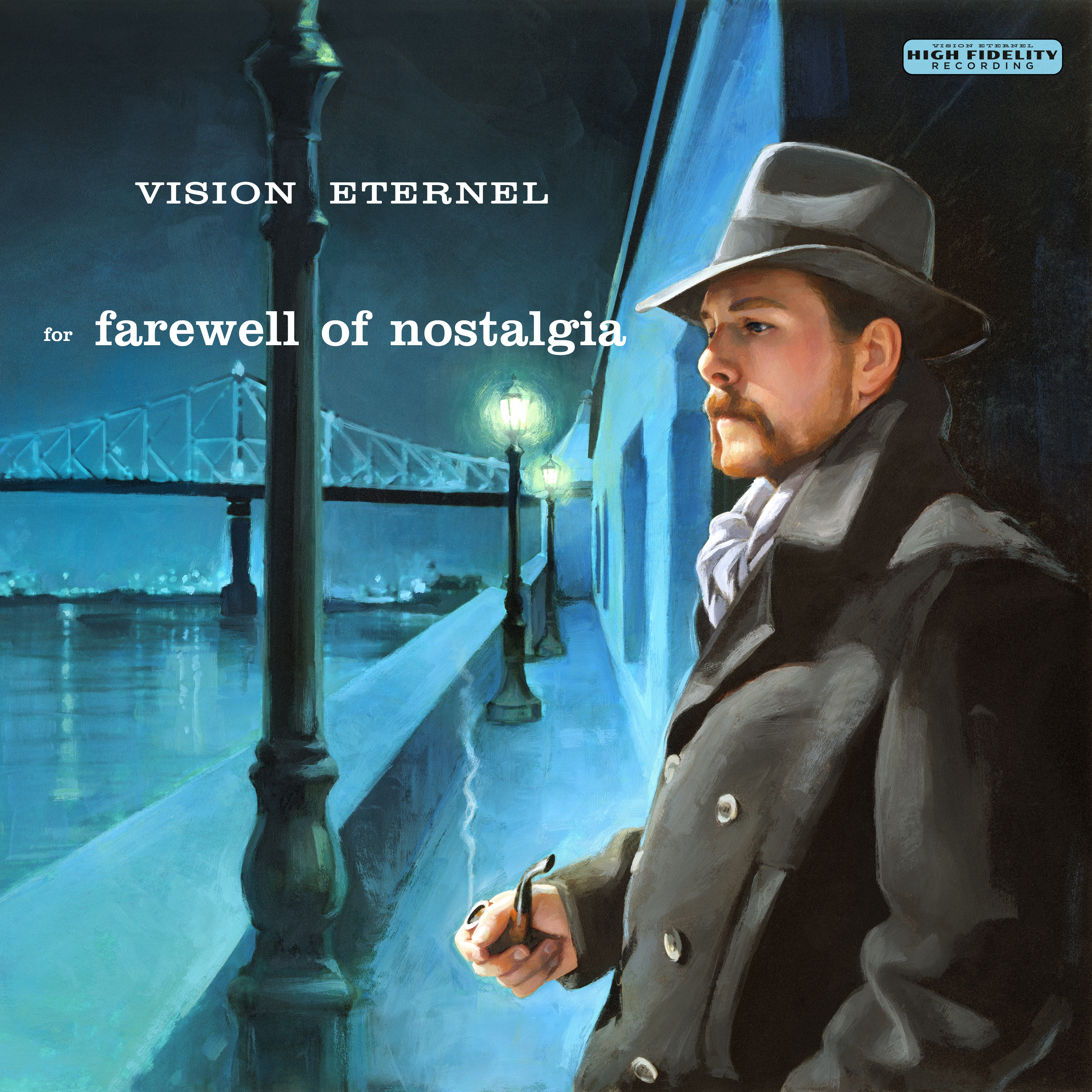
- For Farewell of Nostalgia standard edition cover art.

EP by Vision Eternel
- Released: September 14, 2020
- Recorded: September 12, 2018 – November 12, 2019
- Studio: Mortified Studios, Wexford, Quebec, Canada
- Genre: Ambient; ethereal; post-rock; shoegaze
- Length: 32:02
- Label: Abridged Pause; Geertruida; Somewherecold
- Producer: Alexander Julien

Vision Eternel chronology
Echoes from Forgotten Hearts (2015)	For Farewell of Nostalgia (2020)

Advanced Compact Disc Edition cover
- For Farewell of Nostalgia limited Advanced Compact Disc Edition cover art.

For Farewell of Nostalgia is the sixth and final extended play by Canadian-American ambient rock band Vision Eternel. It was co-released by Somewherecold Records, Abridged Pause Recordings, and Geertruida on September 14, 2020, on compact disc, compact cassette, and digitally. Physical editions of the release were packaged with a short story.

The extended play is a concept album themed around heartbreak and a Dear John letter to the city of Montreal. The release is instrumental and blends elements from several genres and styles, including ambient, shoegaze, post-rock, ethereal, drone, space rock, emo, post-black metal, post-metal, dark ambient, experimental rock, progressive rock, minimal, dream pop, modern classical, and new-age. Its cover artwork is a tribute to Frank Sinatra's album In the Wee Small Hours.

The release took almost four years to complete. The music was composed and arranged by principal band member Alexander Julien during 2017 and 2018. For Farewell of Nostalgia was first recorded over seven months, between April–October 2018, at Julien's own Mortified Studios in Wexford, Quebec. Unhappy with the material, he shelved the release for a year before fully re-recording the songs between October–November 2019. Initially scheduled for release on February 14, 2020, to tie in with the band's yearly Valentine's Day commemoration, For Farewell of Nostalgia was pushed back by seven months due to delays with artwork and complications with record labels and pressing plants during the early outbreak of the COVID-19 pandemic.

== Background ==
=== Early attempts (February 2015 – December 2016) ===
Alexander Julien had hoped to begin work on Vision Eternel's sixth concept extended play (which later took shape as For Farewell of Nostalgia) shortly after the completion of the band's fifth release, Echoes from Forgotten Hearts, in early 2015, but was instead caught up with other musical and biographical projects. Between February and September 2015, Julien composed and recorded material for his other bands, Vision Lunar, Soufferance, Citadel Swamp, and Éphémère, and relocated to a new town. In October 2015, when he set out to work on Vision Eternel again, he was struck with writer's block, a condition that lasted seventeen months.

In the interim, Julien compiled the Various Artists compilation album Billowing Tempestus (a follow-up to 2009's Diluvian Temperals), scheduled for release through his independent record label, Abridged Pause Recordings, and worked on biographical research projects for defunct musical groups and classic Hollywood celebrities. Although Julien made several attempts to compose music during that time, his creativity lacked direction, and he was unable to write a single new song. In an interview with Captured Howls, Julien described this period as "difficult" because he was accustomed to releasing a minimum of one yearly album by at least one of his bands or projects. He said, "During that downtime, I occasionally picked up one of my guitars with really great intentions, but nothing good would come out of it." Julien, who already suffered from chronic depression, felt at a loss over the situation because he could not figure out the cause of his writer's block. He also told The Moderns: "I was not especially aware of the time that was passing by; I assumed that I would naturally gravitate back into music once inspiration had returned."

=== Shift in focus (December 2016 – February 2017) ===
In December 2016, Julien shifted his focus back toward Vision Eternel again. Having overlooked the tenth anniversary of two of his bands, Soufferance in September 2016 and Vision Lunar in October 2016, he did not want to miss out on Vision Eternel's forthcoming tenth anniversary in January 2017. Julien planned to dedicate all of 2017 to celebrating Vision Eternel's first decade with the release of the retrospective boxed set, An Anthology of Past Misfortunes, and other merchandise.

Julien also came to terms with the cause of his writer's block. Taking part in several musical projects over the years, he concluded that he had over-expanded himself musically. He suffered from stress and anxiety from expectations of what he felt each of his bands needed to sound like and struggled with the pressure of delivering new content to honor several record label agreements. He told Captured Howls that this was dividing his energy and creativity instead of focusing it on a single goal. He found this to be counterproductive as it was placing limitations on his songwriting, which he detailed: "Each of my bands or projects had to have distinct sounds and composition styles, which oftentimes led to really good guitar parts being left out because they did not fit with what I dictated a band should sound like."

He had also grown displeased with the dynamics of working with band members and wanted to focus his energy on a solo project. As a result, in December 2016, Julien ended Soufferance and Citadel Swamp, quit Éphémère (though he was only a sporadic session member), and put Vision Lunar on an indefinite hiatus. He told Idioteq he chose Vision Eternel because "Out of all of my bands, it has always been my favorite; my most personal and intimate."

=== Demos and delays (February 2017 – April 2018) ===
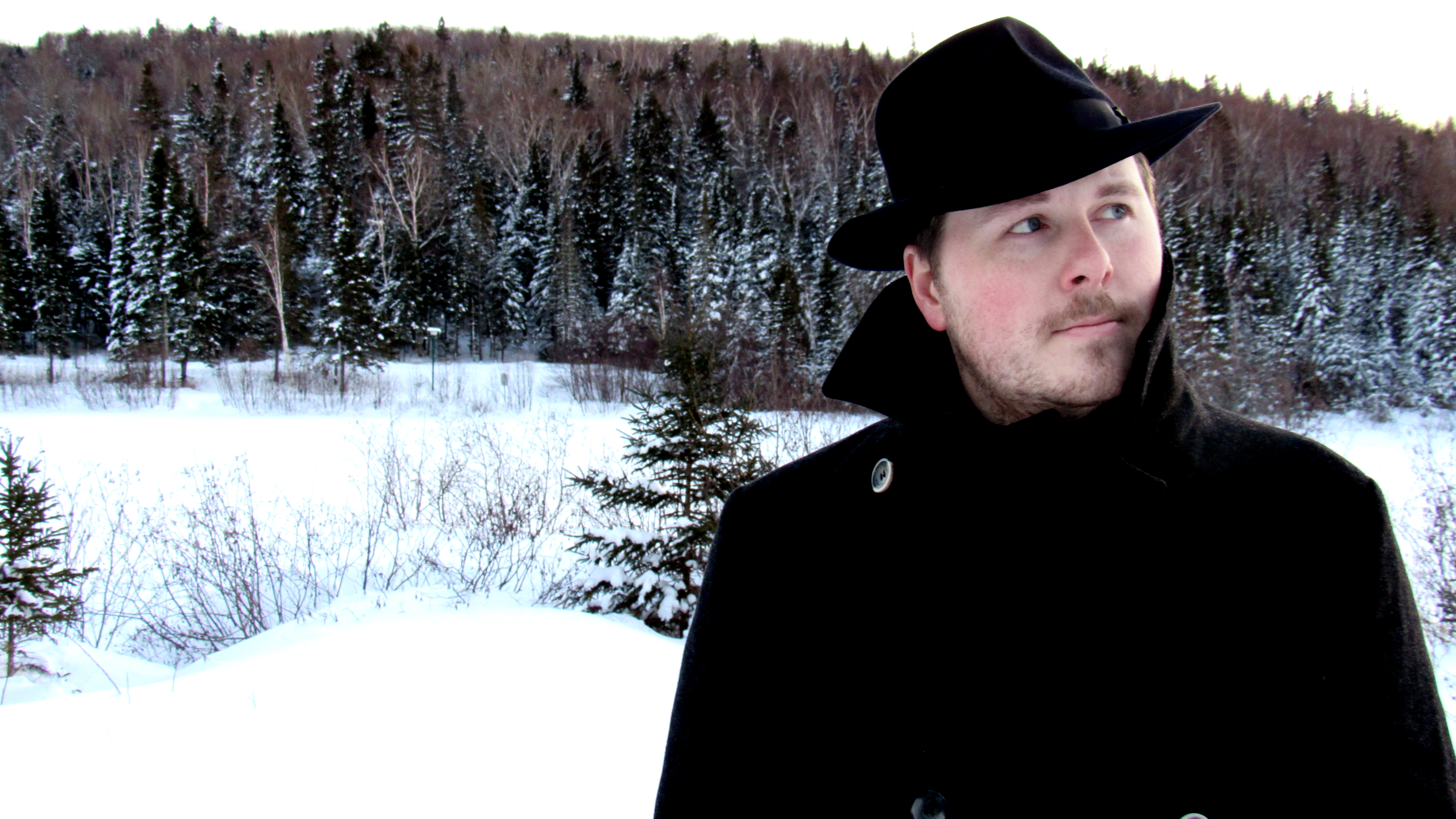
Vision Eternel photographed in Notre-Dame-de-la-Merci, Quebec on January 8, 2017, for the band's tenth anniversary.

During the early promotion of Vision Eternel's tenth anniversary in February 2017, former The Aquarian Weekly and Metal Maniacs editor JJ Koczan discovered Echoes from Forgotten Hearts and published a favorable review of the release on his webzine, The Obelisk. Koczan ended his review by expressing his hope for new Vision Eternel material to be released shortly; he also added the band's entire discography to his streaming radio program, The Obelisk Radio. This encouragement proved rejuvenating for Julien, who later confessed that it had been over three years since Vision Eternel had received press coverage.

In several interviews conducted around the release of For Farewell of Nostalgia, Julien singled out Koczan's review as the turning point for him to begin the nearly four years of work towards completing Vision Eternel's next extended play. That very month, he began composing new songs, re-arranging older ones, and by April 2017, was recording rough demos at Mortified Studios, his home studio in Wexford, Quebec. Julien was hopeful that Vision Eternel's next extended play would be completed before the end of 2017.

However, the band's tenth anniversary projects soon forced him to suspend composing and put the new release on hold. The retrospective boxed set, An Anthology of Past Misfortunes, which Julien saw as the highlight of the band's celebration (and which had been in development since 2010), took priority, along with other merchandising and the production of a music video for "Piéce No. Trois." The boxed set, too, suffered extensive delays and was released fourteen months late, on April 14, 2018. Immediately upon the boxed set's release, Julien returned to work on composing and recording For Farewell of Nostalgia.

== Recording and production ==
=== First recording session (April – October 2018) ===
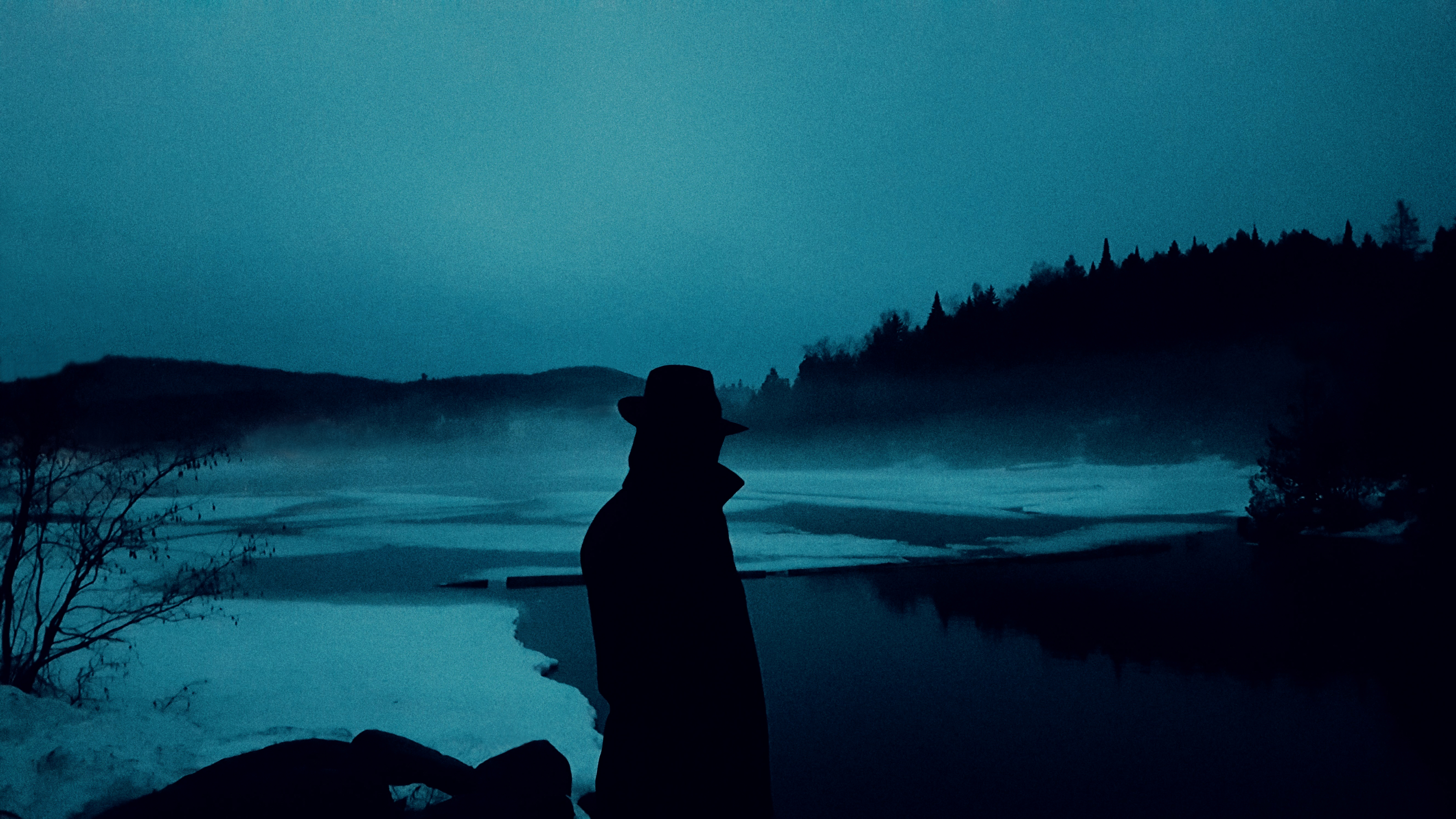
Vision Eternel photographed in Wexford, Quebec on April 10, 2017, during For Farewell of Nostalgia's demoing sessions.

Julien was only satisfied with a portion of the songs he had composed and demoed in 2017 and felt that this early material needed better arrangements. The greater part of For Farewell of Nostalgia was composed, arranged, recorded, and mixed over seven months, from April to October 2018. When first announcing the release in May 2018, a hopeful Julien told The Obelisk that the extended play would be complete before the end of the year, and he was aiming for an early 2019 release date. However, he later described the 2018 sessions to New Noise Magazine as "tedious and disorganized." He also told Idioteq that the process was slow because he did not have a completed release ready to be recorded, and as a result, he was composing and arranging while simultaneously recording and mixing.

A total of fifteen songs were composed and arranged between the 2017 and 2018 sessions, and Julien briefly considered releasing the material as a double-extended play. But the 2018 sessions lacked focus, and Julien's ideas, direction, and motivation changed throughout the spring, summer, and autumn. He grew increasingly unhappy with the atmosphere and tone of individual songs and the release as a whole. He initially aimed for a Wall of Sound type of production but was unable to mix the material to his satisfaction, describing one of the songs as having "a total of 180 tracks, all with different effects, some re-routed and looped through each other." He later told It's Psychedelic Baby! Magazine that he was never satisfied with the mixes because there were too many layers and effects to deal with, adding "I would return to a song after having recorded another, only to feel the desire to re-mix it all over again. This went on for months."

Julien described the general sound of the 2018 version of For Farewell of Nostalgia as "a lot darker, harsher, and more abrasive, not only in sound but in nature." He felt this applied not only to the recording and production but also to the way that he played his instruments. He identified the recordings as sounding more like ones of his other bands, Soufferance or Citadel Swamp, in that they lacked the clarity and hopefulness usually present in Vision Eternel songs. He also stated that because the songs sounded so different from each other, there was a lack of flow and unity to the release and that it no longer felt like the concept extended play he envisioned. He felt that he was instead compiling an album of random songs.

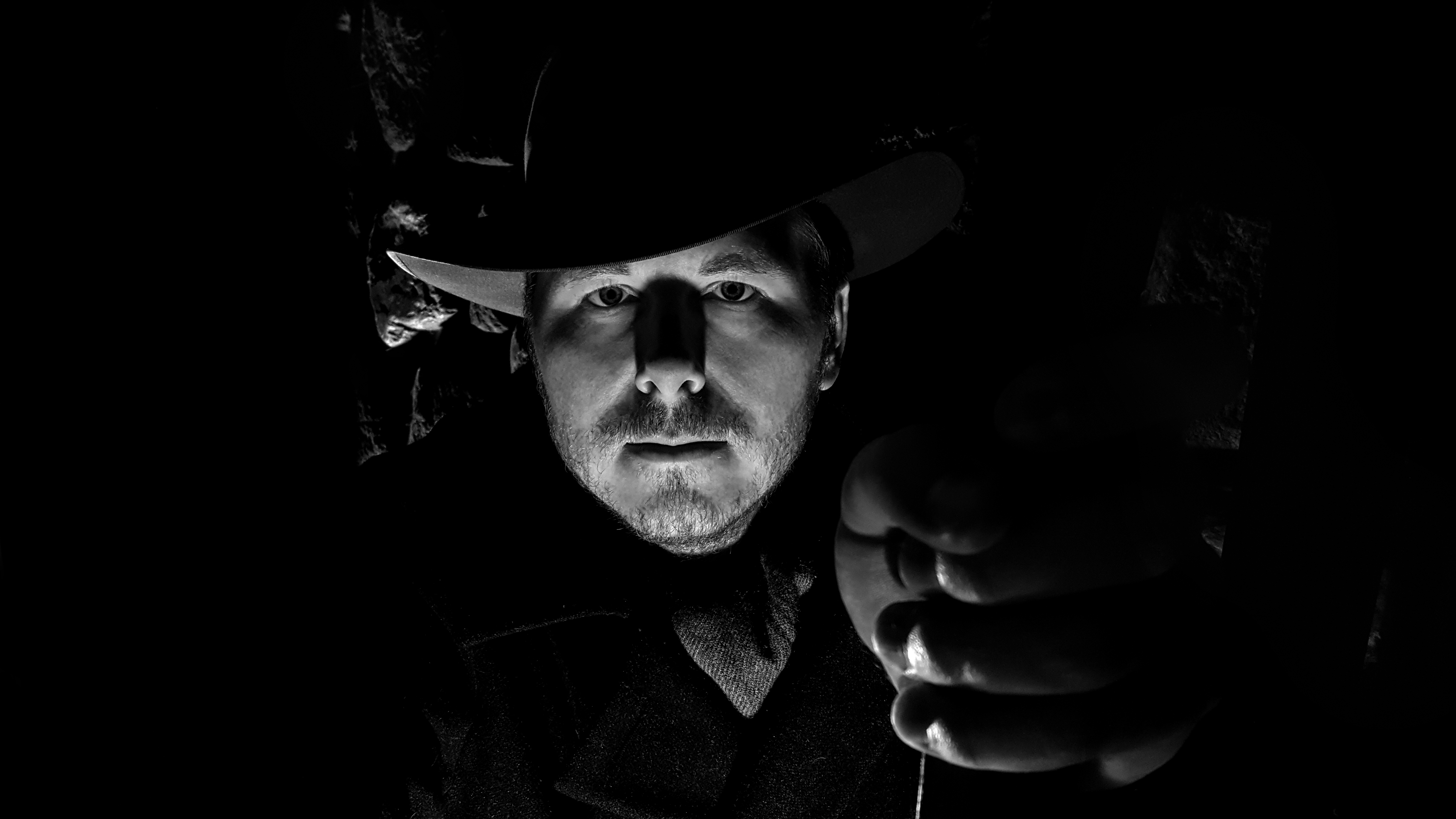
Vision Eternel photographed at Mortified Studios in Wexford, Quebec on July 22, 2018, during For Farewell of Nostalgia's first recording sessions.

Concurrently, Julien realized that many of his recordings had irreparable audio glitches, like crackling, distortion, humming, and pops, caused by faulty studio equipment. He began re-tracking the unusable segments but was soon faced with other issues of fret buzz and pickup noise from his guitars. This also prevented him from finishing the overdubs. Looking back on the situation, he told Metal Temple he was growing dissatisfied with the release and the "endless recording and mixing sessions." He added that he was becoming disconnected from the emotions he was trying to capture and share with his music and that because so much had to be re-recorded, which required him to revise his gear, he considered shelving the release.

By this time, Vision Eternel had received interest from fifteen to twenty record labels eager to release the extended play after hearing unfinished mixes. Julien described this situation to Captured Howls as "precarious," admitting he was afraid of jeopardizing relationships with record companies if he put the release on hold. He added, "But I felt that if a record label was going to invest in my music, it should be the best material that I could offer." In October 2018, Julien decided to indefinitely shelve For Farewell of Nostalgia until he could return to the release with a fresh perspective.

=== Break and compilation appearances (October 2018 – October 2019) ===
Over the next twelve months, from October 2018 to October 2019, Julien upgraded his studio equipment and instruments. In an interview with Captured Howls, he revealed that during his writer's block, he had "shamefully neglected my gear and equipment," and that two of his guitars were in such bad condition that they needed leveling and hardware upgrades from a luthier.

He also revised the extended play's content and arrangements, creating a blueprint from which to work for the planned re-recording session. Julien decided that the entire extended play needed to be re-recorded from scratch, and spent the year sifting through the fifteen songs that had been composed, to pick out the best content and finalize their arrangements. In the process, some compositions were combined to make "longer and better-flowing songs," while others were already well-developed and remained intact; some were also kept as b-sides. Julien did not compose any new material during this period.

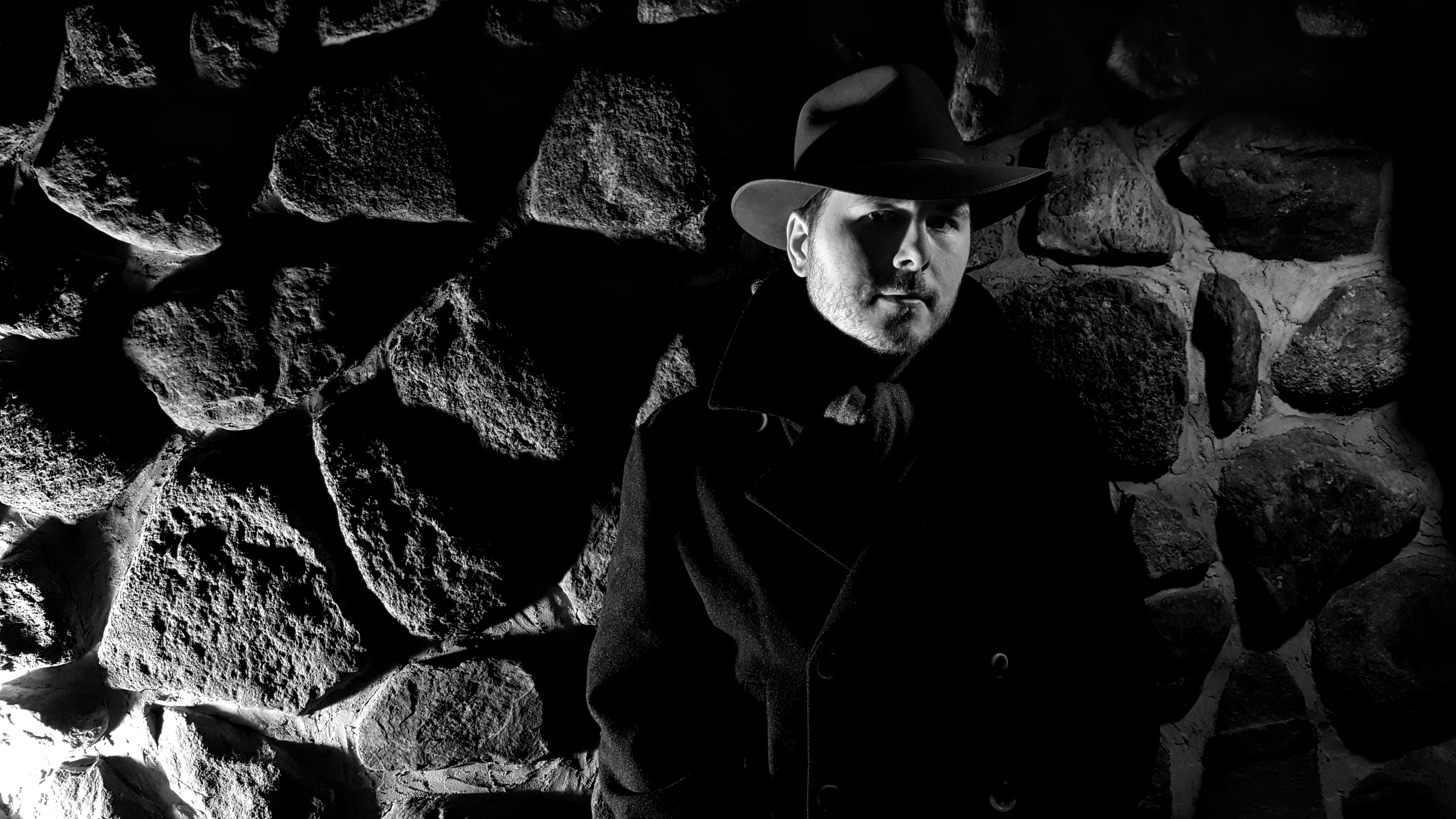
Vision Eternel photographed at Mortified Studios in Wexford, Quebec on July 22, 2018, during For Farewell of Nostalgia's first recording sessions.

Although Julien was unhappy with Vision Eternel's material recorded in 2018, several recordings from those sessions were released. The first song to be issued was "Moments of Intimacy (Reprise)" on August 10, 2018, which was used as a teaser for the forthcoming extended play on YouTube via The Obelisk. A full version of the song was later uploaded to YouTube on November 30, 2018, and it was also included as a hidden bonus track on Somewherecold Records' edition of the For Farewell of Nostalgia compact disc.

Three songs were also licensed as exclusives to Various Artists compilation albums: "Moments of Intimacy" was released on Feedback Through a Magnifying Glass, Volume I, issued by Coup Sur Coup Records on November 27, 2018; "Moments of Absence" appeared on Forest of Thorns: A Dornwald Compilation, issued by Dornwald Records on March 25, 2019; and "Killer of Giants" (an Ozzy Osbourne cover) was used on Fruits de Mer Conducts: Deep Sea Exploration, issued by Fruits de Mer Records on November 2, 2019.

A handful of other recordings from the 2017 and 2018 sessions were compiled for the Vision Eternel compilation Lost Misfortunes: A Selection of Demos and Rarities (Part Two), which came packaged as an exclusive to Geertruida's compact cassette edition of For Farewell of Nostalgia. Finally, Julien explained that "two or three guitar tracks" from the 2018 recording sessions ended up on one of the songs on the released extended play because he felt the emotions were stronger on the original recordings than on the re-recorded versions.

=== Second recording session (October – November 2019) ===
For Farewell of Nostalgia was re-recorded at Mortified Studios in five weeks, from October 4 to November 12, 2019. Julien wanted a way to control and maintain his mood and emotions during the entire recording session. He wanted to sustain a constant level of sadness and depression so that all of the songs would share the same mood, emotional atmosphere, and depth, and so that the release would sound like a concept extended play. Discussing the session with New Noise Magazine, he elaborated: "I wanted to remain in the same somewhat-depressed-yet-motivated state while I tracked the songs."

"I would start my day by reviewing the previous night's recordings, then decide if I was in the mood to work on new material. If I was not, then I would immediately watch a Frank Sinatra film. As soon as the film was over, and while the emotions of the movie were still with me, I would begin recording. Later at night, if I was in a lull or having an off-day with my guitar-playing, I would sit back and watch more of his films until the inspiration to record came back to me."

—Alexander Julien, New Noise Magazine

To accomplish this, he isolated himself in his studio for the span of the tracking session. He also restricted his activities, limiting what he saw, heard, and felt. He deliberately did not listen to music, confessing to New Noise Magazine that he "did not want to be consciously influenced by anyone's style or genre." He further detailed his motivation with The Noise Beneath the Snow: "I wanted the sound and atmosphere of my songs to be organic to my instinct, to my subconscious." He also confined his reading to books about classic Hollywood films.

Julien further controlled his mood by using visuals, carefully selecting and positioning two pieces of artwork he could gaze at while recording, along with a narrow selection of movies. One of these artworks was a painting of his maternal grandparents' cottage, where he had spent most of his summers as a child, and which invoked "positive nostalgic memories" from his past. The second visual was Frank Sinatra's In the Wee Small Hours cover artwork, which Julien singled out as one of his favorite albums. He revealed to New Noise Magazine that Sinatra's album had kept him company on many lonely nights while he was depressed and heartbroken, becoming "somewhat of a best friend; the only thing that I could rely on to help me get through the night." Julien noted that the album was helpful to him during the events upon which For Farewell of Nostalgia is based and was, therefore, filled with "saddened nostalgia" from his past. He connected with the cover artwork and took indirect inspiration from Sinatra's album during the recording and mixing sessions, which helped pull the concept extended play together.

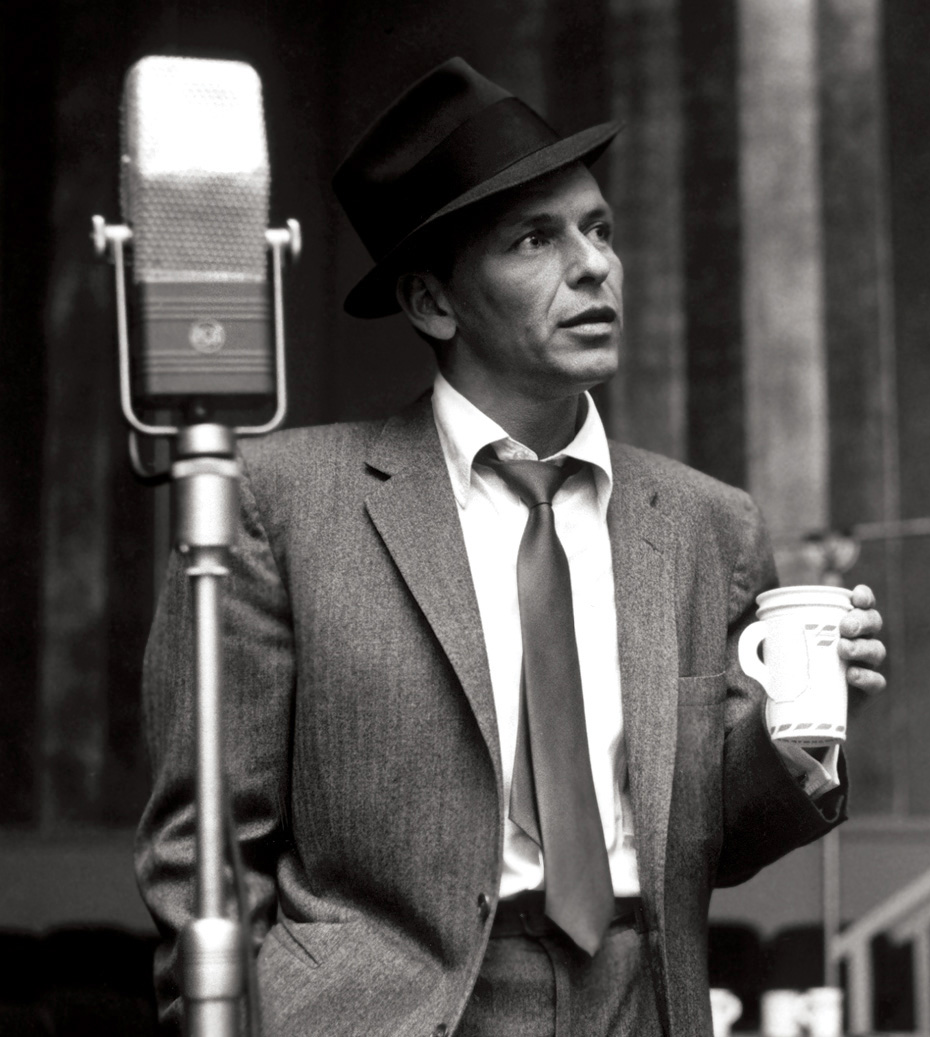
Frank Sinatra's music and films played an important role in the sound and emotional atmosphere of For Farewell of Nostalgia.

Sinatra further influenced For Farewell of Nostalgia when Julien resolved to only watch the singer-actor's films during the recording session's duration. Julien singled out movies like From Here to Eternity, Some Came Running, The Manchurian Candidate, The Man with the Golden Arm, Suddenly, Pal Joey, and The Detective as some of his favorite motion pictures, which he watched repeatedly during his isolation. On watching those features, Julien told The Noise Beneath the Snow that it helped to keep him on the edge of sadness and depression, "not enough to deprive me of motivation but just enough to keep me on a roll of creativity." He also told It's Psychedelic Baby! Magazine that the recordings' mood, tone, atmosphere, and sound are attributed to Sinatra's acting, based on how he felt after watching the films.

All of the music on For Farewell of Nostalgia is performed by Julien using electric guitars, acoustic guitars, and electric bass guitars. When asked about electronic instruments' use, he told Metal Temple he saw Vision Eternel as a rock band, and there were no digital instruments like keyboards, synthesizers, samplers, or sequencers on the band's recordings. On previous Vision Eternel releases, Julien restricted himself to using a single guitar to record a whole extended play. However, he used multiple instruments for For Farewell of Nostalgia, including three electric guitars, two acoustic guitars, and one electric bass guitar. He told Idioteq that this provided him "a bigger sound" and that "different guitars resonated more aptly to various sounds and tones that I wanted."

One of Julien's goals with For Farewell of Nostalgia was to use his EBow on all of the songs, which he told Terra Relicta had become a recognizable sound for the band. The first piece of music that opens the extended play in "Moments of Rain," is produced using an EBow. The 2019 re-recording session also allowed him to add textural guitar lead overdubs to the songs, which he had been unable to achieve in 2018 due to studio issues. Julien felt this made a drastic difference for the songs, rendering them "more accessible" and giving them greater depth, sentiments, and melody.

One week (from November 5–11, 2019) was dedicated to recording acoustic guitar tracks for the extended play, notably for the slow rhythmic build-up in "Moments of Nostalgia." Julien used two different acoustic guitars: one six-string, and another twelve-string. During the session, acoustic versions of all songs were demoed for a planned companion extended play. However, the mixing of these was problematic, and all of the acoustic material was shelved. Instead, Julien wound up re-recording the backing track for "Moments of Nostalgia" with an electric guitar. The version of "Moments of Nostalgia" with acoustic guitar was made available on The Spill Magazine's website on February 14, 2021, as part of the band's yearly Valentine's Day Exclusive celebration. On November 19, 2019, The Obelisk reported that principal production had been completed on Vision Eternel's For Farewell of Nostalgia.

=== Post-production (November 2019 – January 2020) ===
The post-production of For Farewell of Nostalgia lasted a month and a half and included editing, mixing, sequencing, and mastering. Julien was meticulous about the editing and mixing process and approached the material differently than he had for the 2018 recordings. He described the 2018 mixing as having "far too many layers of effects and endless reverb." When asked how he achieved For Farewell of Nostalgia's "dreamy reverb, effects, and atmosphere," Julien told New Noise Magazine that he deliberately decreased the number of effects on the mixes until his guitar notes could be heard distinctly, rather than be "buried and blurred into a haze of reverb."

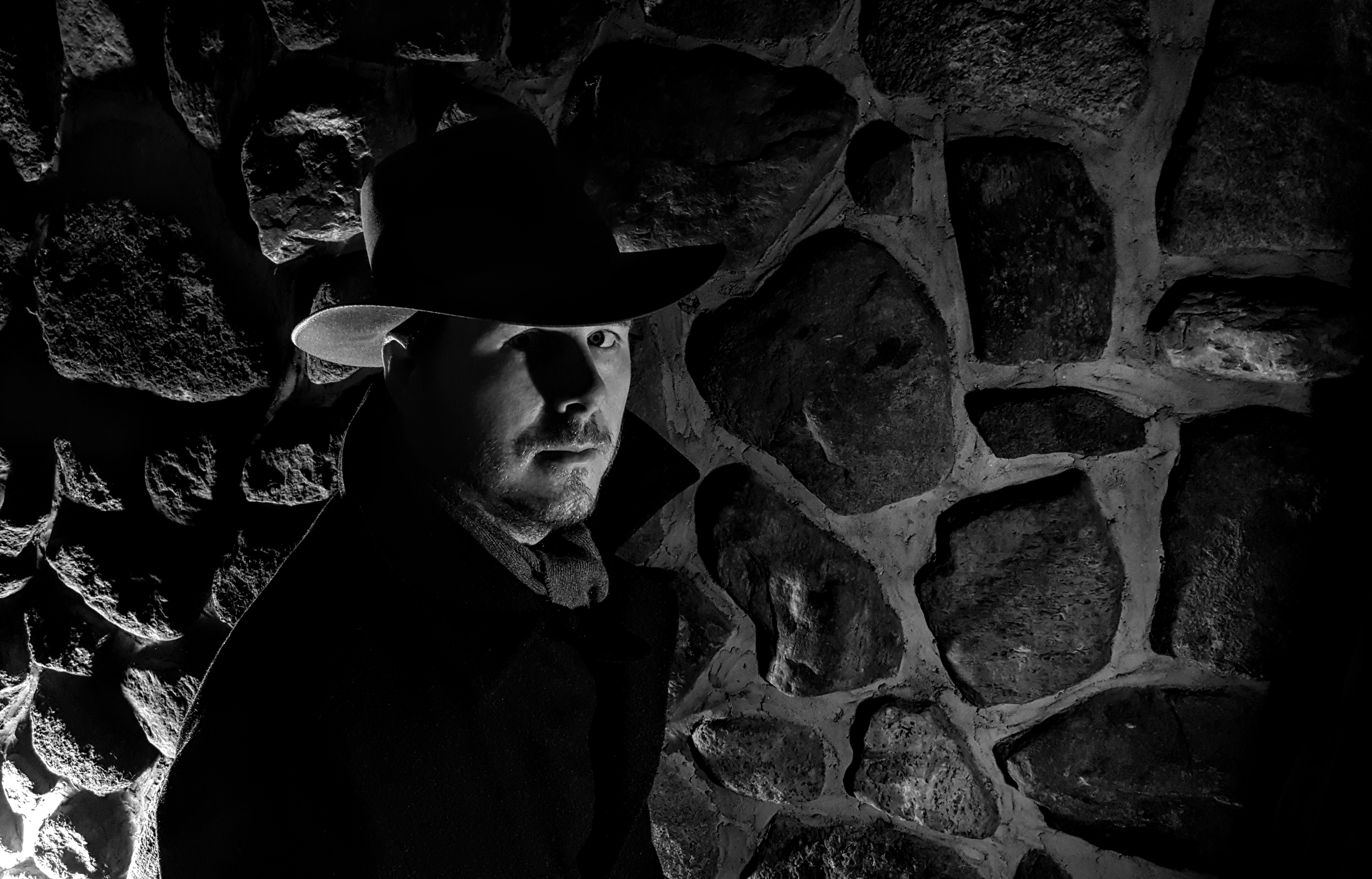
Vision Eternel photographed at Mortified Studios in Wexford, Quebec on July 22, 2018, during For Farewell of Nostalgia's first recording sessions.

Julien also told New Noise Magazine that he disliked the mixing process and did not consider himself a producer despite studying audio engineering. He disclosed: "I simply took on the role by default because I was recording in my studio and needed to be self-sufficient." During the extended play's post-production, Julien began to ease off on his restrictions, allowing himself to listen to The Beatles to combat listener fatigue and anhedonia. He told Captured Howls: "I tend to get negative when I over-analyze my recordings and end up disliking the songs themselves." He noted that listening to The Beatles' later-era records with studio equipment enabled him to discern small playing mistakes and background noises. He added: "Hearing that such high-profile and established releases as theirs can have an acceptable amount of tiny mistakes was refreshing and motivating, and it helped me resume the mixing of my extended play."

The songs' sequencing was an important element for the concept extended play and had already been determined during the 2018 recording sessions. Julien edited and mixed the songs in a way that each was complementary to the next, making sure that the release flowed as a whole. However, he felt restricted by the various physical mediums on which For Farewell of Nostalgia was to be released. This was not an issue for digital formats, such as compact disc, download, and streaming, but the compact cassette and vinyl record mediums required each side to have almost equal lengths. Julien was challenged by this as the extended play included only four songs, which had to remain in the decided order. He resolved this by preparing exclusive b-sides to be inserted as hidden songs at the end of the compact cassette and vinyl record's A-sides. Post-production wrapped up at Mortified Studios on December 24, 2019.

Former Vision Eternel member Adam Kennedy was initially secured to master For Farewell of Nostalgia during the release's first recording session in 2018. Kennedy had mastered Vision Eternel's third extended play, Abondance de périls, in 2010, and was also offered the same job for The Last Great Torch Song in 2012 and Echoes from Forgotten Hearts in 2015, but had been too busy to accept. Kennedy became unavailable during For Farewell of Nostalgia's one-year interim in early 2019, and Julien looked elsewhere.

Once For Farewell of Nostalgia was re-recorded in 2019, Julien concluded that Carl Saff at Saff Mastering was the only mastering engineer he wanted. He told Terra Relicta that while listening to Castevet's album The Echo & The Light, he decided that the person who mastered that release should master his new extended play. Julien booked a telephone call with Saff in late November 2019 to discuss the release and what he wanted in the final sound. Saff first mastered the extended play on January 2, 2020. The band then asked for a few alterations, and although Saff provided a second mastering, Julien wound up selecting the first mastering for release.

== Songs ==
=== Composition ===
"My creative process for Vision Eternel is rather solitary. I tend to isolate myself in my studio for periods of time when I get the urge to compose and record new music, and I associate with even fewer people than I normally do. I am a bit of a recluse to begin with, so being by myself to work on my art is very fulfilling."

—Alexander Julien, The Spill Magazine

With For Farewell of Nostalgia, Julien approached the composition of Vision Eternel songs differently than he had for the band's previous releases. He did so because he wanted to incorporate songwriting elements once reserved for his other bands. When he decided to focus solely on Vision Eternel in December 2016, he ended his black ambient band Soufferance and his ambient band Citadel Swamp, quit the dark ambient band Éphémère, and put his atmospheric black metal band Vision Lunar on an indefinite hiatus.

Doing so opened up a lot of potential for him, as many compositional and playing styles once reserved for other bands were now free to use with Vision Eternel. He told The Noise Beneath the Snow about his intention: "I was not planning on re-inventing Vision Eternel, but rather, I wanted to incorporate the best of what I liked from each of my other bands into Vision Eternel. Vision Eternel was still going to sound like Vision Eternel; it would just have more to it." Julien reflected that it took a long time to amalgamate the different elements into Vision Eternel and polish the music to his satisfaction. He described the songs that were demoed in 2017 as "rough and abrasive" because he was "overwhelmingly trying to fit a bit of everything in each song."

Julien composed and arranged a total of fifteen songs for For Farewell of Nostalgia, but only about half of them were used on the final release. Some of the songs were constructed as individual lengthy pieces, while others were shorter and ended up combined into longer tracks for better flow, resulting in the four principal songs: "Moments of Rain," "Moments of Absence," "Moments of Intimacy," and "Moments of Nostalgia."

Julien identified the lengthier songs as the most obvious difference in the band's newer material. By comparison, Vision Eternel's older songs were typically one to two minutes, and an entire release spanned ten to fifteen minutes. This was an element he brought over from Soufferance, along with the use of segues and movements, drawn-out emotional build-ups, and hypnotic and repetitive codas. While covering the subject with Terra Relicta, Julien noted that some crossover between Vision Eternel and Soufferance had been happening for years, including the Soufferance song "A Memory of Past Emotions" and the Vision Eternel songs "Sometimes in Absolute Togetherness" and "Pièce No. Sept." But it was with For Farewell of Nostalgia that he finally perfected the mix of styles.

Another component carried over from Soufferance was its use of watching movies to invoke specific emotions right before recording sessions, which was utilized extensively during the 2019 tracking of For Farewell of Nostalgia. Julien added textural guitar leads to Vision Eternel's new songs, an element he said was brought over from Éphémère and Vision Lunar. Finally, he incorporated his method of mixing and layering multiple instruments to make "leads flow over rhythm tracks," which he had employed in Citadel Swamp.

=== "Moments of Rain" ===
Parts of "Moments of Rain" were composed in 2010, and others in 2018. The song was sequenced into the extended play during the 2019 re-recording session because Julien was unhappy with "Moments of Remorse," which formerly opened the release in 2018. "Moments of Remorse" was later included in the Lost Misfortunes: A Selection of Demos and Rarities (Part Two) compact cassette compilation, along with an unused take of "Moments of Rain" from the 2019 session.

"Moments of Rain" is divided into three movements: "Moments of Anticipation," "Moments of Bloom," and "Moments of Rain." Julien described the first movement, "Moments of Anticipation," as a direct link between the band's 2012 concept extended play, The Last Great Torch Song, and For Farewell of Nostalgia. The former release included the song "Sometimes in Anticipating Moments" (composed in 2010), which was abridged and re-arranged into "Moments of Anticipation." The remaining two parts, "Moments of Bloom" and "Moments of Rain," were composed and arranged in 2018.

Julien stated that "Moments of Rain" represents grief within the concept of the extended play. He further broke down the context of each movement of the song to The Noise Beneath the Snow:

-"Moments of Anticipation" is the symbolic bridge between The Last Great Torch Song and For Farewell Of Nostalgia. This is where the story starts off. A heartbreak was recently dealt with; boy recently lost girl.

-"Moments of Bloom" is the symbolic spring in emotions; not necessarily the season as this portion takes place at the end of summer. Rather, it is in the sense that the character has moved on from the past relationship and is starting to feel better about himself again. He has rejuvenated, like a perennial.

-"Moments of Rain" is the more obviously symbolic autumn, in both season and emotions. With a lonely winter approaching, there is a feeling of an oncoming depression.

=== "Moments of Absence" ===
"Moments of Absence" is the oldest composition on the release. Formerly titled "Season in Absence," Julien composed it in 2007, and a recording was released on the band's second extended play, Un automne en solitude, in 2008. After Nidal Mourad and Adam Kennedy joined as members of Vision Eternel in 2008, the band began working on a new arrangement for the song. This new arrangement was later recorded in 2010 under the updated title "Sometimes in Absence" and was planned to be included in The Last Great Torch Song. However, the recording was never completed and remained unreleased until the band made it available for free download for its yearly Valentine's Day Exclusive celebration in 2023.

The composition received additional arrangements throughout 2017 and 2018 and another title change to "Moments of Absence." The new version of the song is divided into four movements: "Moments of Renewed Absence," "Moments of Endeared Absence," "Moments of Utter Absence," and "Moments of Forgotten Absence." Julien described the first movement, "Moments of Renewed Absence," as very similar to the original song, "Season in Absence," while the second part, "Moments of Endeared Absence," resembles "Sometimes in Absence" and is similar to what the tune sounded like with Mourad and Kennedy. He noted, however, that the version of the song with a three-piece band was presented differently, with Julien performing rhythm electric guitar, Mourad performing rhythm acoustic guitar, and Kennedy layering it with an electric guitar solo. The third and fourth segues of the song, "Moments of Utter Absence" and "Moments of Forgotten Absence," were composed and arranged specifically for For Farewell of Nostalgia.

Julien stated that "Moments of Absence" represents loneliness and time spent alone between relationships within the concept of the extended play. He further broke down the context of each movement of the song to The Noise Beneath the Snow:

-"Moments of Renewed Absence" symbolizes the renewed feelings of depression, getting accustomed once again to being alone and dealing with those feelings. This is caused by the realization that another lonely winter is coming up and there will be no one with whom to cuddle; the realization that absence is now a renewed emotion.

-"Moments of Endeared Absence" symbolizes the finding of beauty in absence. Having lived with depression for most of my life, I have grown to enjoy and cherish absence. To treat it as a friend. This part of the song is very moving and beautiful.

-"Moments of Utter Absence" symbolizes the realization, or rather the breaking point, of no longer wanting to be alone. Absence, which was previously beautiful and enjoyable, has turned ugly and bitter. This part of the song becomes more dissonant.

-"Moments of Forgotten Absence" symbolizes a brief recovery after the painful episode expressed in the last segue; the awakening of a new day.

=== "Moments of Intimacy" ===
"Moments of Intimacy" is the only new composition retained from the band's 2017 demoing session, but it was heavily re-arranged in 2018 and 2019. Julien described the song's early development as having different styles of guitar picking, a different tempo, and another atmosphere. He noted that it took a long time to develop and arrange and that the finished version is hardly recognizable from the rough demos recorded in 2017.

The song was considered for a lead single in 2018, which Julien envisioned in a slimline jewel case packaging, including various takes and versions of the composition. A reprise version was used as a teaser for For Farewell of Nostalgia in August 2018 and included as a hidden bonus track on Somewherecold Records' edition of the For Farewell of Nostalgia compact disc.

"Moments of Intimacy" is divided into five movements: "Moments of Pursuance," "Moments of Seduction," "Moments of Intimacy," "Moments of Consummation," and "Moments of Radiance." Julien stated that "Moments of Intimacy" represents falling in love at first sight and the hope of a new relationship within the concept of the extended play. He further broke down the context of each movement of the song to The Noise Beneath the Snow:

-"Moments of Pursuance" and "Moments of Seduction" are very dark and brooding, but incredibly emotional parts. They reminisce wandering through a thick, ensconcing fog, in the old parts of the city, desperate to find someone to share the night with. The whole movement is very sad, but very romantic.

-"Moments of Intimacy" and "Moments of Consummation" depict the finding of a love partner. It is about love at first sight, passion and intimacy.

-"Moments of Radiance" symbolizes completion and the deepest kind of happiness. The hope for a long-term relationship.

=== "Moments of Nostalgia" ===
"Moments of Nostalgia" was the final song composed for the extended play in 2018, long after the band decided on using For Farewell of Nostalgia as the release's title. Julien told Idioteq that he wanted to use the word nostalgia early on in the extended play's development because it is an emotion he experiences every day. However, he explained that he felt self-conscious about using the word in a song or album title and did not want to be dishonest by releasing subpar material under its banner. He stated: "I felt that if a release used a word as heartfelt as nostalgia, it had to live up to it. I wanted to be respectful of it."

The song remained close to its demo form and received little additional arrangements during the re-recording session. The band offered a demo version for free download for its yearly Valentine's Day Exclusive celebration in 2020 and a different take with an acoustic guitar backing track for its 2021 Valentine's Day Exclusive. A pre-production recording and a reprise version were also included in the Lost Misfortunes: A Selection of Demos and Rarities (Part Two) compact cassette compilation.

"Moments of Nostalgia" is divided into five movements: "Moments of Melancholia," "Moments of Nostalgia (Overture)," "Moments of Nostalgia (Suite)," "Moments of Nostalgia (Closure)," and "Moments of Desideria." Julien stated that "Moments of Nostalgia" represents the heartbreak and remembrance within the concept of the extended play. He further broke down the context of each movement of the song to The Noise Beneath the Snow:

-"Moments of Melancholia" is closely linked to the previous "Moments of Radiance"; the two songs fade into each other as night becomes dawn. This part recounts waking up the next morning, in a somewhat dream-like state, when the consciousness starts to overtake the subconscious. The girl is gone.

-"Moments of Nostalgia (Overture, Suite and Closure)" documents the mourning in nostalgia, forever cherishing the memory of a night which was never established as real or dreamt up.

-"Moments of Desideria" closes For Farewell of Nostalgia and is about hoping that the girl will someday return.

== Concept ==
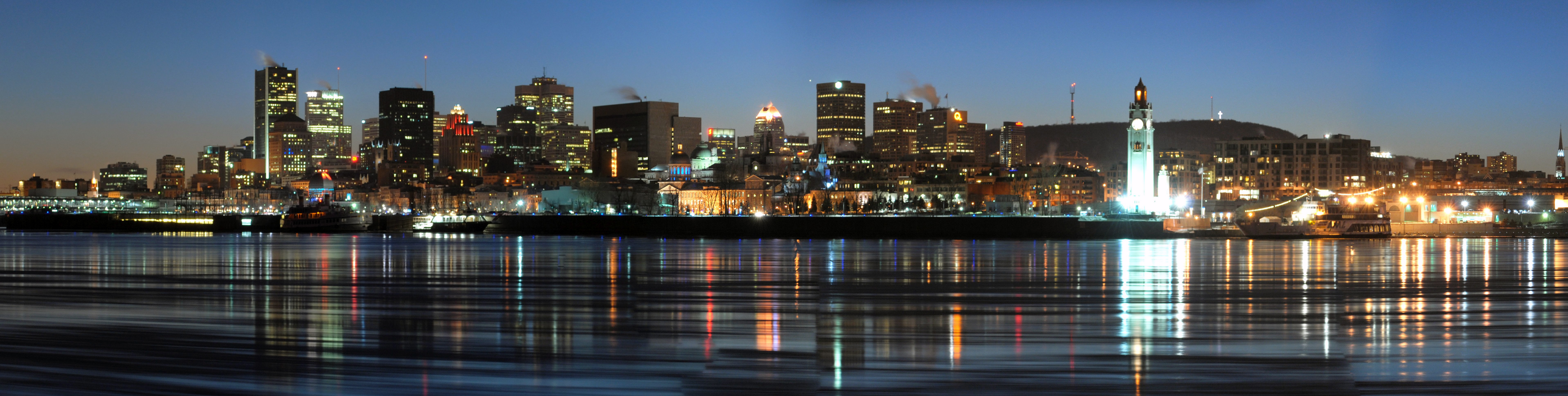
Alexander Julien offered a Dear John letter to Montreal with For Farewell of Nostalgia.

When asked to describe For Farewell of Nostalgia's concept and plot in an interview with New Noise Magazine, Julien stated that it details "falling in love at first sight, the intimacy of a one-night-stand and its aftermath: a heartbreak once the realization hits that the feeling is not reciprocal." He further opened up to Idioteq, stating: "It is a documentation of how something so brief can hurt for so long and stay with you for the rest of your life." With It's Psychedelic Baby! Magazine, he shared: "There was a lot of pain following that brief romance and I wanted to capture its beauty and sadness."

He also described the release as an ode and Dear John letter to Montreal. Julien related that although he grew up and formed Vision Eternel in Edison, New Jersey, he was born in Montreal and returned to the city as a young adult. He felt that, even though he no longer lived in the city, the band continued to have a symbolic tie to Montreal. Reminiscing about his time in Montreal and the meaning behind the extended play's title, he explained to New Noise Magazine: "Those were years of infatuation; years of broken hearts. I wanted to say "Thanks for the memories, the wonderful and the miserable; now good-bye." I also wanted to state that I would not be forgetting these events, but rather, that I would be cherishing these memories, in nostalgia, for the rest of my life."

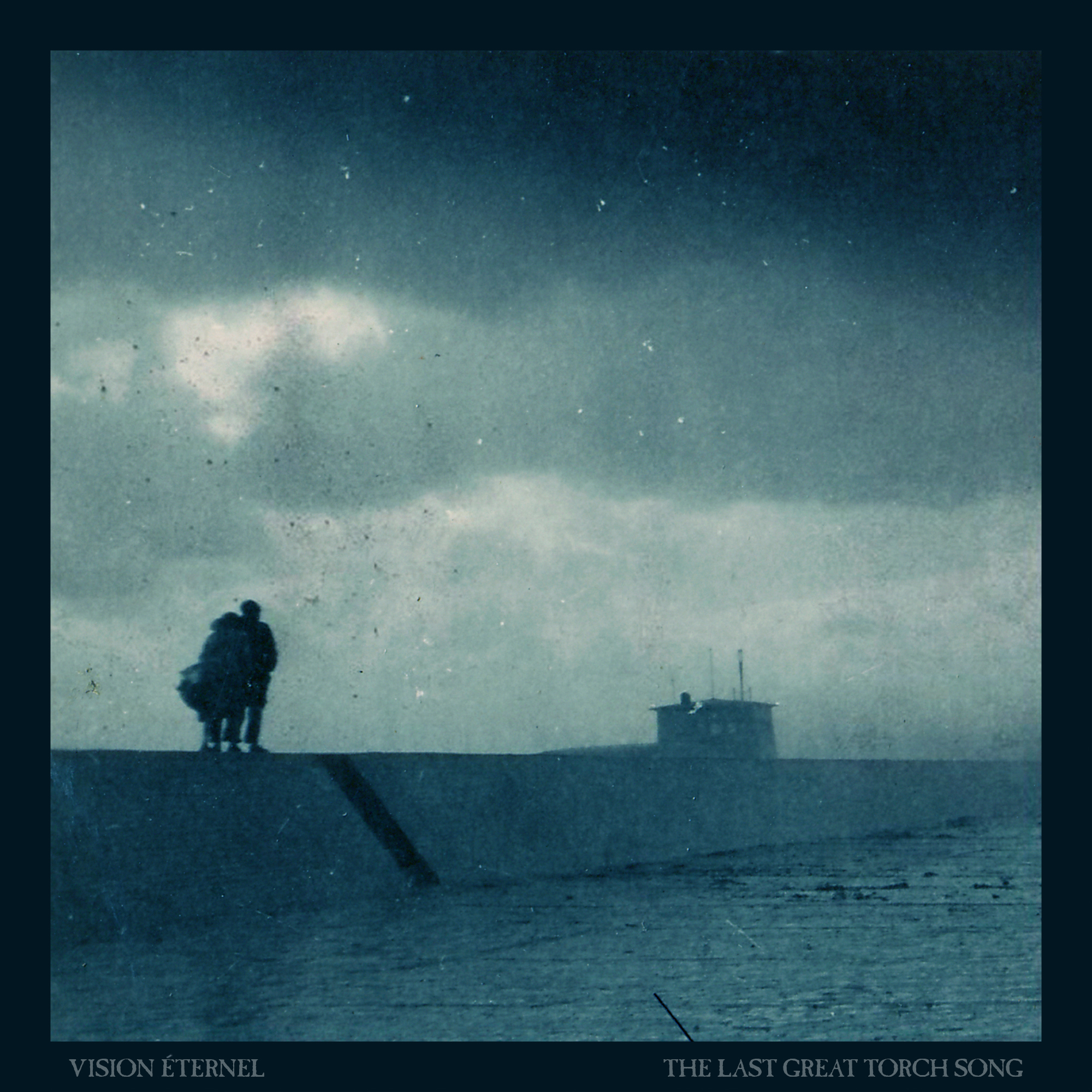
For Farewell of Nostalgia is a follow-up to Vision Eternel's 2012 extended play The Last Great Torch Song.

Julien had previously planned a series of concept releases that covered his return to, time in, and departure from Montreal for his other band, Soufferance. It included the album Memories of a City (recorded in 2011), but the series was never completed. Julien noted that with For Farewell of Nostalgia, he was able to close that cycle and concept.

For Farewell of Nostalgia is a continuation of Vision Eternel's "greater story-line" concept extended play series, which Julien describes as "pieces of a puzzle" that connect and mirror his life and past relationships. For Farewell of Nostalgia picks up immediately where Vision Eternel's 2012 extended play, The Last Great Torch Song, left off (2015's Echoes from Forgotten Hearts was composed as a soundtrack and is omitted from the conceptual timeline).

An audio bridge was incorporated between the two releases by re-recording a section of "Sometimes in Anticipating Moments" (which appeared on The Last Great Torch Song), re-titled "Moments of Anticipation," and sequencing it as the first piece of music one hears when playing For Farewell of Nostalgia (the first movement of "Moments of Rain"). Julien told The Noise Beneath the Snow that the storyline for For Farewell of Nostalgia starts in the autumn, following a late summer break-up at the end of The Last Great Torch Song.

=== Titles ===
Vision Eternel dedicates considerable time figuring out its release and song titles. Julien told Terra Relicta: "Everything Vision Eternel does is so conceptually connected that a lot of thought and planning goes into it; none of it is last-minute or an afterthought." He broke down his process as having to put himself into the state in which he was when the heartbreak occurred and taking notes of specific words during the composing and recording stages, which he feels are relevant to the sentiments and themes he experiences. Once several words are noted, he expands them into an original release title. He told The Moderns that Vision Eternel's release titles must always be original and that if any tentative titles are similar to other albums or works of art, they are discarded.

"I felt that if my release was to use the word nostalgia, then the music, the production, the story, the artwork and the physical packaging all have to live up to it. I did not want to use the word nostalgia for effect; I wanted it to be representative of what I was offering."

—Alexander Julien, New Noise Magazine

The word nostalgia came up early during the making of the extended play while Julien was demoing material in 2017. Recounting the process with Terra Relicta, he admitted that he was both secretive and uneasy about using the word in a Vision Eternel title. He told the webzine that because of an experience when a Soufferance album's titles and concept were appropriated by another band, he makes it a point to be tight-lipped about his releases until they are completed. As such, the title For Farewell of Nostalgia was not revealed until the extended play was nearly completed in late 2018.

Julien was also apprehensive about using the word nostalgia in a title, explaining: "There was a fear that it might not live up to its name." He affirmed to Terra Relicta that because nostalgia was so important and a meaningful state of emotion in his life, he needed to be able to represent it honestly and respectfully. He admitted to The Moderns: "I was unsure if my music deserved to use it." Julien noted this dilemma as one of the leading reasons why he was so motivated to re-record the release in 2019 and so meticulous with the extended play's concept, mastering, artwork, and packaging.

Concerning the meaning of the title itself, Julien elucidated that he took a slight poetic liberty and that it is to be interpreted as for the well-being of nostalgia. It is intended as an ode to nostalgia. He affirmed: "I am in no way saying good-bye to these events and memories; I am instead stating that I will cherish them forever and look back on them fondly."

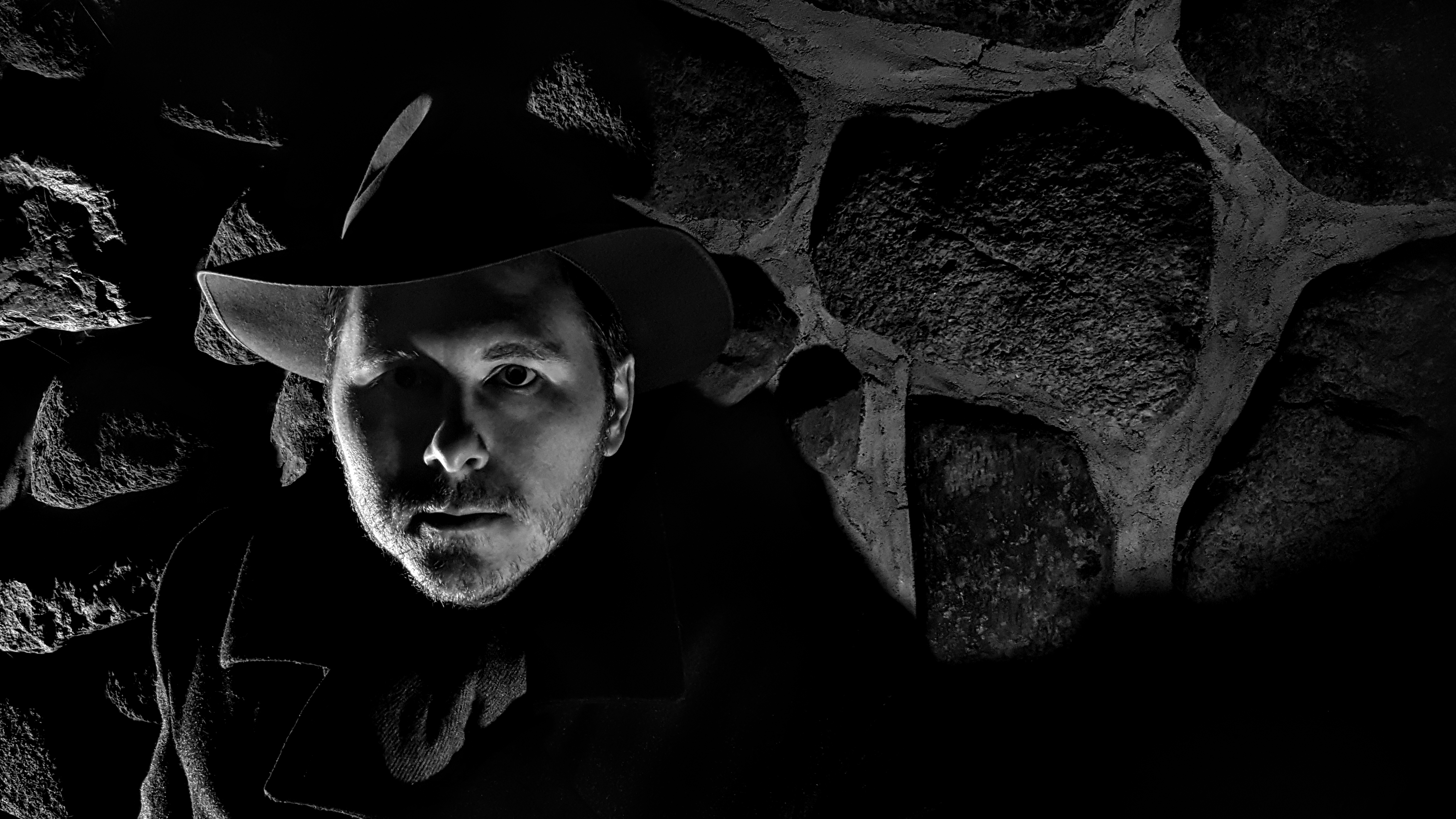
Vision Eternel photographed at Mortified Studios in Wexford, Quebec on July 22, 2018, during For Farewell of Nostalgia's first recording sessions.

Vision Eternel's song titles have a similar selection process to the release titles. Julien broke down his method into two steps: deciding on the prefix of every song title and selecting the main words for the proper song titles. Julien told The Obelisk that "Moments of" was a prefix he had planned to use for The Last Great Torch Song's song titles, but it did not fit with the releases' complex "greater story-line."

The song titles play an important part in Vision Eternel's extended play concepts in that they represent the sequential phases and chapters of the story. Julien points out the recurring theme "Boy meets girl, boy loses girl," explaining that the song titles detail the progression of the events, from the relationship to the heartbreak. The titles of the songs also need to match up with the band's "greater story-line."

Julien revealed to The Obelisk that the titles of the songs contain a secondary, hidden concept: "Adding the first letter of each song title spells out the name of the girl to whom the extended play is dedicated." This concept was utilized in all Vision Eternel extended plays. As such, Julien detailed that he knew beforehand how many songs were to be on a Vision Eternel extended play based on how many letters were in the girl's first name. He also related that Vision Eternel songs are technically only given a single-word title ("Rain," "Absence," "Intimacy," and "Nostalgia") so that if ever re-recorded (as was the case for "Absence" and "Anticipation"), it could be adapted to the prefix of the new release.

The four songs on For Farewell of Nostalgia were subdivided into seventeen movements, each with expanded titles, which Julien voiced was a concept he wanted to make use of for about fifteen years. He told The Obelisk that this was an element that impressed him from Harmonium's concept album L'Heptade and that he had used it to a lesser degree on Soufferance's album Travels Into Several Remote Nations of the Mind. The extended track listing was deliberately omitted from the digital edition of the release because Julien intended it to be paired with the short story, which is also exclusive to the physical editions. The principle and extended song titles are designed to act as chapters for the short story.

=== Short story ===
"I wanted it to be part of the experience of enjoying the release. I did not want this to be yet another ambient album that people put on and use as background music. I wanted listeners to feel the way that I felt when I composed and recorded these songs. I wanted to reflect some of the melancholia that I was living with, not only through the music but also through words."

—Alexander Julien, Captured Howls

Julien wanted to include a short story with the extended play so that the emotions and essence of the instrumental music would come across faithfully. He likened the inclusion of the short story to other bands offering lyrics in the booklet of their albums. Julien had previously included a poem in An Anthology of Past Misfortunes' booklet, but this was his first time offering a whole story to tie into the concept.

The short story, also titled For Farewell of Nostalgia, was written over eleven days during the post-production of the extended play in December 2019. Julien was usually reserved when asked about the context and influence behind the story. He told The Obelisk that it documented the events that inspired For Farewell of Nostalgia and was about falling in love too fast and the pain of heartbreak that followed. He also said: "It is about learning to befriend absence and loneliness and living with constant sentiments of nostalgia and melancholia." Opening up to Captured Howls, he revealed that the general theme throughout For Farewell of Nostalgia was "sad and lonesome but always hopeful." He broke down the story as going from being lonely to having someone to being lonely again.

The band chose to only include the short story in the physical editions of the release as a way to thank fans for procuring tangible goods and give them exclusive content. Julien also explained that the short story is intended to be read while listening to the music and that the text is divided into chapters that tie in with the songs and movements within the songs.

== Artwork ==
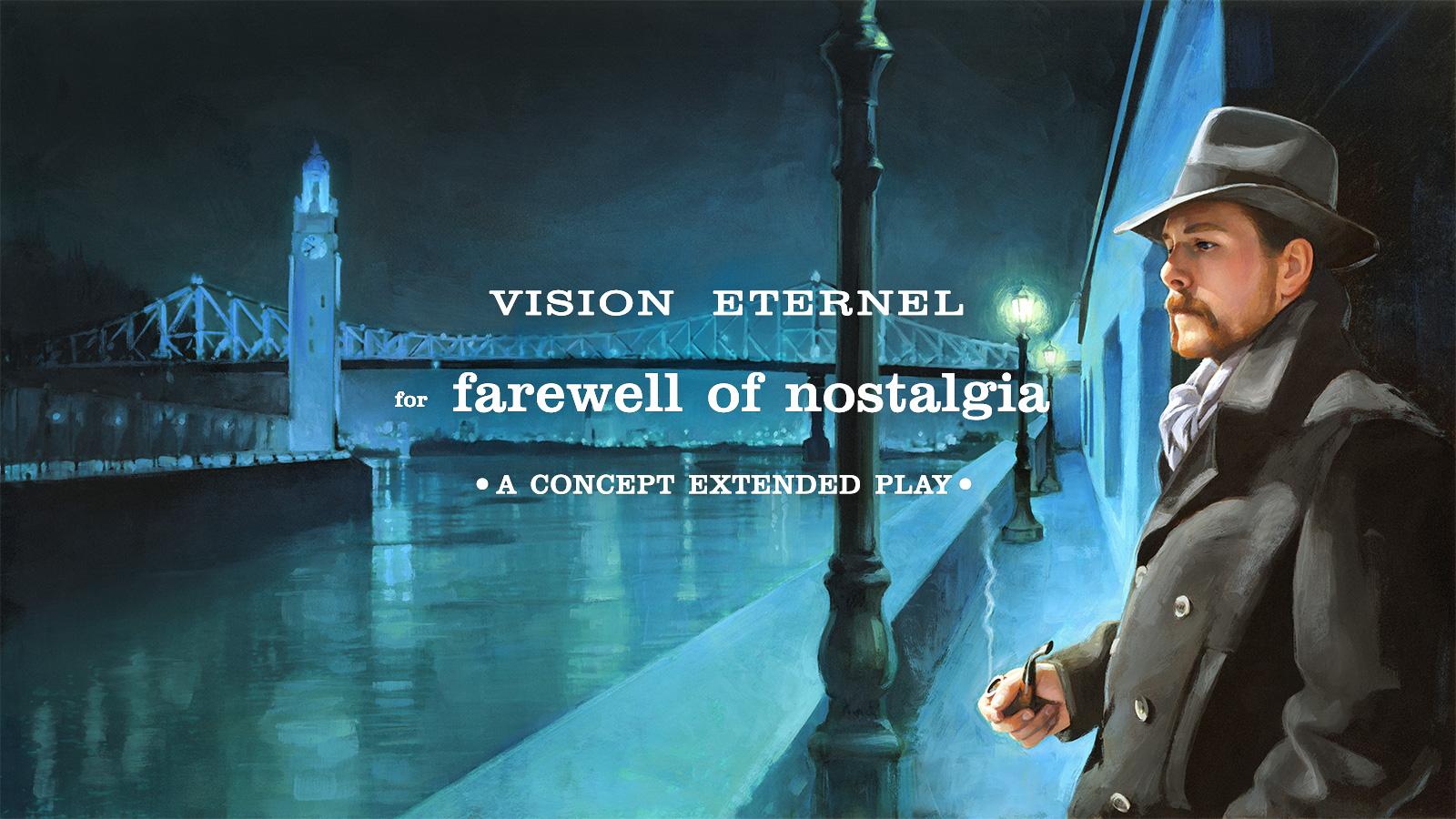
Promotional flyer for For Farewell of Nostalgia showing Michael Koelsch's full painting.

The band spent considerable time working on the artwork for the release, dealing with numerous illustrators in the process. The idea of basing the cover art on Frank Sinatra's album In the Wee Small Hours originated in March 2011 while Julien was working on The Last Great Torch Song. He and photographer Jeremy Roux planned a photo shoot during which Julien was to pose in matching clothes and with a similar background to Sinatra's album cover. However, by the time The Last Great Torch Song was completed in September 2011, Julien had forgotten about the Sinatra tribute and instead used a photograph by Marina Polak for the cover artwork. Julien and Roux later filmed a video to promote The Last Great Torch Song in March 2012, which prominently features the Montreal Harbor Bridge in the background and which Julien purposely incorporated on the cover art of For Farewell of Nostalgia as a symbolic bridge between the two releases.

Julien again thought of In the Wee Small Hours in late 2019, as the album's cover art had been so helpful in setting the mood during the re-recording of For Farewell of Nostalgia. He told New Noise Magazine: "It seemed to make perfect sense that I should pay homage to Frank Sinatra." Because he did not want to offer a simple recreation of Sinatra's original artwork (which he said would have been cheap and disrespectful to his idol), Julien spent several months putting together a mockup of the exact artwork he wanted, from photographs taken by Roux and Rain Frances. He told Metal Temple that the new artwork had to be "an equal mix of Frank Sinatra and Vision Eternel."

"I was aiming for an eye-catching presentation with the artwork of For Farewell of Nostalgia. I did not want people to look at my release and think "Hey, this looks like a nice peaceful album," in the manner in which so many album covers remain descriptive of their genres. I want new listeners to be intrigued by it, and to approach it from a different perspective than they are used to."

—Alexander Julien, Goat Palace

Since the release is partly a tribute to Montreal, Julien incorporated some of his favorite buildings and landmarks in the mockup, ones that are representative of the city, including Old Montreal, the Montreal Harbor Bridge, the St. Lawrence River, the Sailors' Memorial Clock Tower on Victoria Pier, and Windsor Station. Although he wanted his pose to be faithful to Sinatra's, Julien deliberately wore his own clothes to make the artwork more original and relevant to Vision Eternel. He wore one of his vintage fedora hats manufactured in Montreal in 1952, kept his horseshoe mustache, and held one of his tobacco pipes instead of a cigarette.

Julien communicated with dozens of artists between November 2019 and April 2020, hoping to find one who could paint an authentic pulp-style artwork. Three illustrators (including Costin Chioreanu) attempted to create the cover artwork but were rejected before Michael Koelsch was hired in late March 2020. Julien told Metal Temple he had given up hope of finding someone until he discovered Koelsch's work from The Criterion Collection digital video discs and blu-rays. Koelsch, enthusiastic about the project because he was also a fan of Frank Sinatra and In the Wee Small Hours, painted a 16x9 artwork used as a gatefold cover art.

Rain Frances was also commissioned for three paintings used throughout the layout of the physical editions of the release. One was used for the booklet of the short story, another for the stickers on the bonus tape, Lost Misfortunes: An Anthology of Demos and Rarities (Part Two), and a last for the disc cover of the advanced compact disc edition. In addition to the photographs for the release's mockup, Frances had previously provided paintings for Vision Eternel's boxed set An Anthology of Past Misfortunes. Some editions of For Farewell of Nostalgia also feature a Vision Eternel logo by calligraphist Christophe Szpajdel.

== Release and promotion ==
Julien intended to release For Farewell of Nostalgia on February 14, 2020, to tie in with the band's yearly Valentine's Day commemoration, but the extended play was pushed back by seven months due to delays with artwork and complications with record labels and pressing plants during the early outbreak of the COVID-19 pandemic.

The band secured releasing deals with American record label Somewherecold Records for the compact disc edition and Dutch record label Geertruida for the compact cassette edition. Julien's independent record label, Abridged Pause Recordings, issued the streaming and download edition and a limited advanced compact disc edition that served as a promotional press kit. Having to line up a date convenient to all three record labels and their distributors was a factor in the delay.

=== Packaging and video ===
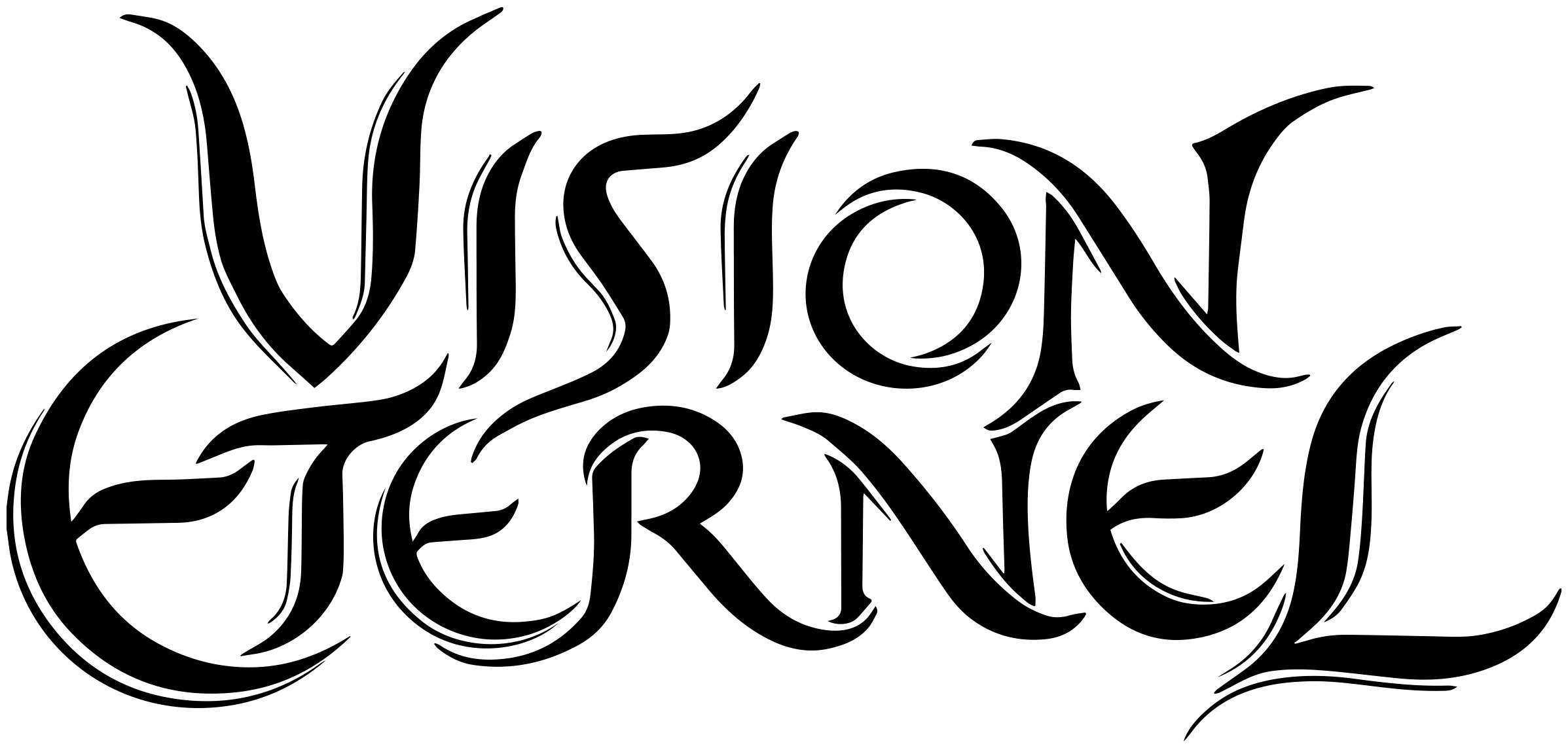
Vision Eternel logo designed by Christophe Szpajdel which appears on some editions of For Farewell of Nostalgia.

When interviewed by Goat Palace, Julien admitted that he felt lucky to have been given artistic freedom by Somewherecold Records and Geertruida, both of which were open to stepping out of their comfort zone to produce custom deluxe packaging options. The compact disc edition, published by Somewherecold Records, comes in a four-panel gatefold eco-wallet, and the compact cassette edition from Geertruida is packaged in a double Norelco case with an oversized booklet. The advanced compact disc edition by Abridged Pause Recordings (which served as a promotional press kit) was presented in a die cut cardboard and envelope sleeve with a sticker. All three physical editions are packaged with short story booklets and are professionally numbered using business cards.

The three physical editions each contain different exclusive and hidden bonus songs. Abridged Pause Recordings' includes "Moments of Extended," Somewherecold Records' includes "Moments of Intimacy (Reprise)," and Geertruida's includes "Moments of Tension." The two compact disc versions have the songs hidden in the pregap, while the tape edition has one hidden at the end of the A-side. The Geertruida release also carries a bonus tape titled Lost Misfortunes: A Selection of Demos and Rarities (Part Two), with twelve alternate takes, demo versions, and b-sides.

External videos
- A Preview of Vision Eternel's For Farewell of Nostalgia EP, from YouTube, video directed by Alexander Julien to promote the release.

Julien directed and edited a short music video entitled A Preview of For Farewell of Nostalgia in January 2020, which contains snippets of the songs "Moments of Absence," "Moments of Intimacy," and "Moments of Nostalgia." The footage was filmed on the bank of the Jean-Venne River in Wexford, Quebec, near Mortified Studios, where the extended play was recorded.

=== Distribution and promotion ===
Pre-orders started on July 23, 2020, when the band and record labels made the video A Preview of For Farewell of Nostalgia available to the public (previously reserved for the press). Invisible Oranges premiered the extended play on September 10, 2020, four days before the official release date on September 14, 2020. The release was distributed by The Business in North America, Clear Spot International and Shiny Beast Music Mailorder in Europe, Juno Records in the United Kingdom, and Linus Records in Japan.

Although no single was officially released from the extended play, "Moments of Absence" appeared on several Various Artists compilations, including A Geertruida Catalogue Selection, released by Geertruida on September 7, 2020, Fruits de Mer Records Unearths: Sounds from the Underground, released by Fruits de Mer Records on November 9, 2020, and The Shoegaze Collective Radio Show: CCXIII, released by The Shoegaze Collective on May 24, 2022.

== Critical reception ==
Professional ratings
Review scores
Source	Rating
Captured Howls	5/5 stars
The Spill Magazine	4/5 stars

Vision Eternel and For Farewell of Nostalgia received overall positive critical reception upon release. Journalists found the release difficult to pigeonhole into a single genre, describing it instead as a blend of several styles, including ambient, shoegaze, post-rock, ethereal, drone, space rock, emo, post-black metal, post-metal, dark ambient, experimental rock, progressive rock, minimal, dream pop, modern classical, and new-age. The band's music was frequently described as cinematic or sounding like a film score. In reviews of the extended play, the band was compared to such artists as Brian Eno, Pink Floyd, Hammock, Sigur Rós, Daniel Lanois, Jeff Pearce, Wishbone Ash, Hans Zimmer, Mike Oldfield, Isao Tomita, Jean-Luc Ponty, Wardruna, and Thy Catafalque, as well as to the greater sound of roster artists from Temporary Residence Limited, Where Are My Records, and Make Mine Music.

Reviewing the release for Captured Howls, Caleb R. Newton rated it a perfect 5-star score. He offered "Vision Eternel has crafted a strikingly poignant piece of guitar-centered ambiance. Instead of sticking to the more "traditional" format of songs, Julien's music features a dramatic flow with billowing, steadily unfolding melodies." He felt that "the tracks also carry a heavy emotional weight," further describing it as "immersive waves of shoegazey guitar melodies with a sense of gradually growing melodrama and a steady blanket of heavy emotional atmosphere. There's a steady heaviness to the sound which feels like pensively somber ballad material." He also offered "[the] new record carries a richly immersive musical journey into emotional depths. The songs feel crisp and emotionally piercing." He also wrote "The record ventures out into a place of emotional cold, but at the same time, there's a sense of security. The release features no lyrics. Instead, Julien has orchestrated the flowing cascades of guitar tones to tell the story on their own. When the dynamic shifts in the consistent and repeating guitar melodies get particularly dramatic, the music feels like a film score."

JJ Koczan at The Obelisk described the band as a "cinematic drone outfit," and an "ambient exploratory outfit — think if post-black metal had a "post" of its own; post-post-black metal." Koczan also offered: "For Farewell of Nostalgia offers rare depth of expression and heart for the microgenre in which it resides. This isn't just a guitarist screwing around with pedals. These are cinematic, narrative pieces tying together to tell a story. The songs are lush and evocative. The melodic wistfulness of Julien's guitar becomes the ground from which the ambience seems to take flight."

Writing for The Spill Magazine, Aaron Badgley rated the extended play four out of five stars and stated: "Concept albums are difficult to do when one has lyrics and vocals, and band founder Alexander Julien manages the task with an entirely instrumental release." He described the release as "beautiful, moody, pensive music" and "full of emotion," and felt that "He creates music that shifts easily from genre to genre and succeeds in creating a cohesive, concept work. This is a very dense, yet beautiful collection of songs telling of love found and lost. For Farewell of Nostalgia is a wonderfully appropriate title for this collection of music." He also offered: "At times he builds the songs so that it sounds like organized noise as the conclusion. This is something Brian Eno is quite good at and established in early ambient records. Julien uses that model and takes it one step further."

Klemen Breznikar of It's Psychedelic Baby! Magazine called it "a very beautiful EP," while Jon Rosenthal of Invisible Oranges offered: "Julien's guitar-based wash is at its most concrete, featuring hidden chord structures and discernible melodies, all filled with a deep longing and sehnsucht." Writing for the webzine Somewherecold, Jason T. Lamoreaux (who also released the extended play through his record label Somewherecold Records) described the music as "epic" and that it "should appeal to shoegaze, ambient, experimental and so many other fans of various genres." Headphone Commute offered that it is "an EP of washed-out guitar strums, dissolving harmonies, and long-stretching tails of reverb. The musical narrative of the pieces is focused on emotion and heartbreak, blending elements of shoegaze, post-rock, and ambiance, and in the process developing a genre. I can hear the torment, I can hear affliction."

For New Noise Magazine, Mick Reed offered: "Vision Eternel has composed many deep and complex releases over the years. The graciously soft and moving album is a mediation on the cycles of love and loss, a contemplative confluence of starward glancing shoegaze and ambient post-rock." He also detailed: "Despite there being no actual lyrics to the album it still managed to capture a literary quality. Music that says so much, with its mere mood and presence, without uttering a single word." Zsolt Kovács at Fémforgács stated that the band had "been creating beautiful atmospheric music since 2007," and was "mainly known [for] thematic albums." He highlighted themes like "loneliness and isolation, resignation and depression, emptiness, passion and the sounds of the heart" as appearing in the music, and pointed out the influences of film noir. Kovács labeled the music as "ambient/prog-rock/space rock/post-rock." Tomaz Vogric of Terra Relicta wrote that "Vision Eternel has released a new cinematic concept work of art. This is may be the most elaborated and most personal work to date in Vision Eternel's discography. This exceptional act endeavors in ambient, ethereal, minimal, emo, post-rock, post-metal for fans of dark music."

Japanese distributor Linus Records included the release in its list of recommendations, Featured Releases of February 2021. A review by company owner Osamu Matsumoto offered "It's a sound made by layering only guitars. It's a mix of early to mid-00s post-rock as well as shoegaze and dream pop, psychedelic space rock, dark ambient with a hint of shadow, and experimental sound." He further described the release as "Hazy guitar strokes with deep reverb. Melancholic and delicate ambient with melodic arpeggios and vague ephemeral phrases, gently looped within the reverberating and relaxing guitar sound." Manfredi Lamartina at Shoegaze Blog wrote "Four moments dedicated respectively to rain, absence, intimacy and nostalgia: practically the tetralogy of being a post rocker. But in the Canadian Vision Eternel project there is no wink at that sadness that can be used well in the sector: if anything, there is empathy, good taste, emotion."

William Zimmerman from The Noise Beneath the Snow tagged the release as "ethereal/dark ambient" with "elements of post-metal, shoegaze and ambient," offering that it "bears the qualities of several genres and none at all in the same breath. It is truly defiant of the somewhat necessary evil called categorization." Ben Taffijn at Nieuwe Noten also felt that way, stating that the band "does not care much about musical styles." He also praised the visual presentation with "[it] is so beautifully depicted by the drawing in film noir style that adorns the cover of the album." John Ellison from Goat Palace further discussed the styles stating "For Farewell of Nostalgia feels like an ambient record, but includes elements from pop to metal to dark ambient, even movie soundtracks." He also declared: "On For Farewell of Nostalgia Julien uses guitars as lyrics, as his voice. The band is reaching for a greater depth of emotional response with these songs. Everything about Vision Eternel feels deeply personal, deeply emotional."

At Chain D.L.K., Carsten Strathmann called the release a "highly conceptualized EP" and said that "The careful arrangements and lush production are those instrumentals strongest points." He broke down the release as "A mellowed out ambience that drifts by moment after moment which invites the listener to drown in his own reflections and memories." John Montoya from Idioteq presented it as "A methodical record that illustrates the pain of heartbreak through the use of ethereal sound that will push and pull your emotions. Comparing sound to feelings, [Julien] paints a series of intimate moments with a guitar and bass. As each song progresses, there is an intimate quality that is felt throughout the record."

Monolith Cocktail's Dominic Valvona wrote that the extended play had a "cinematic and melodious touch," and that it was "an emotive suite of love-lost movements" and "intimate mood music." He further complimented the release with "It's actually a most lovely, touching trembled and graceful encapsulation of the themes; beautifully put together. Nostalgia is certainly evoked on this almost timeless EP of abstracted emotionally pulled memories made tangible." He also felt that it covered several genres, stating: "It's also entirely different. [The band's] lush emo brand of majestic and caressed swirling feelings, heartbreaks and loves, soundtracks a love lost affair with a most swaddled suite of ambient music, shoegazing, and semi-classical longings. [It] pushes experimental, ambient music in different directions, yet never loses sight of taking the listener on those same sonic journeys into the cosmic, imaginary, and intimate."

=== Song review ===
Aaron Badgley of The Spill Magazine singled out "Moments of Absence" as "the highlight of the release." He also praised "Moments of Nostalgia" describing it as: "The heartbreaking conclusion (and yes he accomplishes the heartbreak with his creative guitar work)." Ben Taffijn of Nieuwe Noten described "Moments of Absence" by saying "the level of sweetness rises to almost unbecoming heights," while TimeMachine Productions reported it as "A new-age track emotionally charged that flirts with shoegaze and mixing post-rock with ambient elements" Fabrizio Lusso of WhiteLight//WhiteHeat also singled out "Moments of Absence" in his list Picks of the Week.

Captured Howls' Caleb R. Newton picked "Moments of Intimacy" as the release's shining track, offering: "[It] builds through flowing pulses of melody into a conclusion with some emotionally searing dynamic drama. That song's conclusion feels like a film score, the tones feel big and bold but grounded in some sonically wavering emotional reality." He further added: "When the dynamic shifts in the consistent and repeating guitar melodies get particularly dramatic, the music feels like a film score. This element of the music shines at moments like the conclusion of the album's comparatively lengthy track "Moments of Intimacy." Ben Taffijn of Nieuwe Noten said that the song "gains more weight and a driving structure." While reviewing an early version of "Moments of Intimacy," JJ Koczan of The Obelisk wrote "Quick immersions, scenes from a film that the listener is then left to piece together. Always evocative, even here in this short piece of a short piece, Vision Eternel never quite covers the same ground twice, but constantly seems to move the story forward into some next act."

Ben Taffijn of Nieuwe Noten also described "Moments of Rain" as "rock with ambient in a rather dark and hallucinatory piece," and "Moments of Nostalgia" as a "wall of sound continues briefly in the fourth and last piece."

== Track listing ==
Credits are adapted from the extended play's liner notes. All music is composed and arranged by Alexander Julien.

For Farewell of Nostalgia track listing
No.	Title	Length
1.	"Moments of Rain" I. "Moments of Anticipation" II. "Moments of Bloom" III. "Moments of Rain"	5:05 0:22 2:13 2:30
2.	"Moments of Absence" I. "Moments of Renewed Absence" II. "Moments of Endeared Absence" III. "Moments of Utter Absence" IV. "Moments of Forgotten Absence"	7:23 1:55 2:30 2:02 0:58
3.	"Moments of Intimacy" I. "Moments of Pursuance" II. "Moments of Seduction" III. "Moments of Intimacy" IV. "Moments of Consummation" V. "Moments of Radiance"	11:07 1:33 2:09 2:16 4:35 0:34
4.	"Moments of Nostalgia" I. "Moments of Melancholia" II. "Moments of Nostalgia (Overture)" III. "Moments of Nostalgia (Suite)" IV. "Moments of Nostalgia (Closure)" V. "Moments of Desideria"	8:27 1:44 2:10 2:36 0:36 1:21
Total length:		32:02

Advanced Compact Disc Edition bonus track
No.	Title	Length
0.	"Moments of Extended" (hidden in the CD pregap)	1:49
Total length:		33:54

Standard Compact Disc Edition bonus track
No.	Title	Length
0.	"Moments of Intimacy (Reprise)" (hidden in the CD pregap)	2:32
Total length:		34:37

Compact Cassette Edition bonus track
No.	Title	Length
3.	"Moments of Tension" (unlisted at the end of Side A)	0:35
Total length:		33:26

=== Lost Misfortunes ===
The Geertruida compact cassette edition packaged a second tape titled Lost Misfortunes: A Selection of Demos and Rarities (Part Two), which contains twelve outtakes from the studio recording sessions. The band had previously released another compilation, Lost Misfortunes: A Selection of Demos and Rarities (Part One), as part of its 2018 boxed set An Anthology of Past Misfortunes.

Side C
No.	Title	Length
1.	"Moments of Solitude" (Demo)	3:45
2.	"Moments of Nostalgia" (Reprise)	2:37
3.	"Moments of Intimacy" (Pre-Production Demo)	12:29
4.	"Moments of September" (Reprise)	1:49
5.	"Moments of Neglection" (Reprise)	2:12
6.	"Moments of Extended" (Pre-Production Version)	6:54
Total length:		29:48

Side D
No.	Title	Length
7.	"Moments of Departure"	3:33
8.	"Moments of Remorse"	2:31
9.	"Moments of Serenity" (Demo)	0:57
10.	"Moments of Absence" (Pre-Production Version)	8:34
11.	"Moments of Rain" (Unused Version)	5:34
12.	"Moments of Nostalgia" (Pre‐Production Version)	8:29
Total length:		29:39

== Personnel ==
Credits are adapted from the extended play's liner notes.

Vision Eternel

- Alexander Julien – electric guitar, acoustic guitar, electric bass guitar, eBow

Production

- Alexander Julien – recording engineer, mixer, producer at Mortified Studios; design concept, layout, liner notes
- Carl Saff – mastering engineer at Saff Mastering
- Yannick Tinbergen – analog transfer, packaging at Geertruida
- Michael Koelsch – cover artwork painting at Koelsch Studios
- Rain Frances – additional artwork painting, photography at Rain Frances Art
- Jeremy Roux – photography
- Christophe Szpajdel – band logo calligraphy
- JJ Koczan – liner notes
- Jon Rosenthal – liner notes
- Caleb R. Newton – liner notes

== Release history ==
Release formats for For Farewell of Nostalgia
Region	Date	Label	Format	Catalog
Canada	February 14, 2020	Abridged Pause Recordings	CD (advanced edition)	APR15CD-AE
Worldwide	September 14, 2020	Abridged Pause Recordings	Digital	APR15
United States	September 14, 2020	Somewherecold Records	CD (standard edition)	COLD 062
Worldwide	September 14, 2020	Somewherecold Records	Digital	COLD 062
Netherlands	September 14, 2020	Geertruida	Tape	TRUI079
Worldwide	September 14, 2020	Geertruida	Digital	TRUI079
