= James O'Hara (actor) =

Irish-American actor (1927–1992)

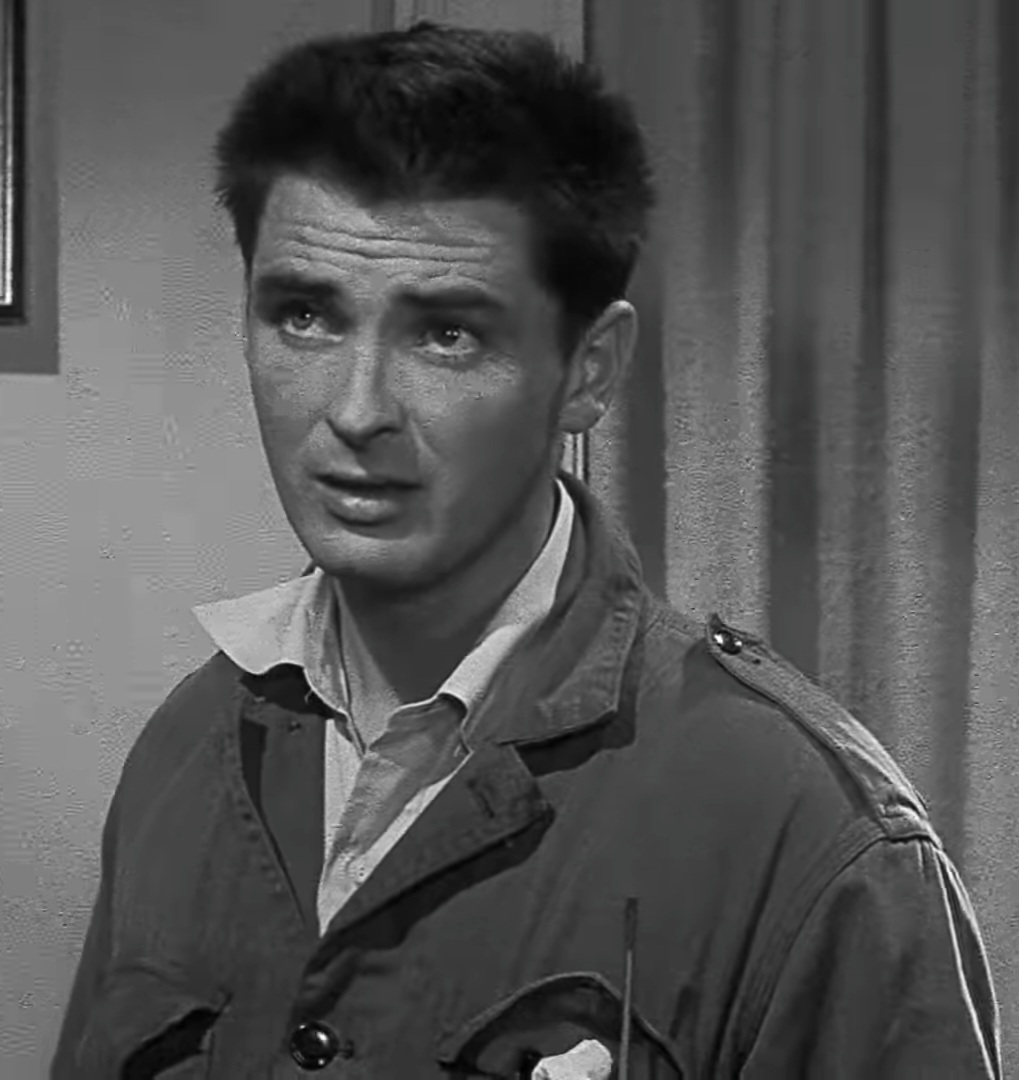
- O'Hara in Suddenly (1954)
- Born: James Fitzsimons; 11 September 1927; Ranelagh, Dublin, Ireland
- Died: 3 December 1992 (aged 65); Glendale, California, U.S.
- Other name: James Lilburn
- Occupation: Actor
- Years active: 1952–1979
- Relatives: Maureen O'Hara (sister); Charles B. Fitzsimons (brother)

James O'Hara (born James Fitzsimons; 11 September 1927 – 3 December 1992), also credited as James Lilburn, was an Irish-born American actor. He is best known for his appearance in the film Suddenly (1954). O'Hara was the youngest brother of Irish actress and singer Maureen O'Hara. His name was sometimes spelled as FitzSimons.

== Filmography ==
=== Film ===
Year	Title	Role	Notes
1952	The Quiet Man	Father Paul	(as James Lilburn)
1952	What Price Glory	Young Soldier	Uncredited
1953	San Antone	Jim Dane	(as James Lilburn)
1953	The Sun Shines Bright	Cadet Leader	Uncredited
1953	Titanic	Devlin - Lookout	Uncredited
1953	The Desert Rats	Communications Man	Uncredited
1953	Sea of Lost Ships	Radion Operator O'Hara	Uncredited
1953	Flight Nurse	British Pilot	Uncredited
1954	Jubilee Trail	Corporal	Uncredited
1954	King Richard and the Crusaders	Castelaine Knight	Uncredited
1954	Suddenly	Jud Hubson	(as James Lilburn)
1954	Malaga	Danny Boy	(as James Lilburn)
1954	Hell's Outpost	Waiter	Uncredited
1955	The Long Gray Line	Cadet Thorne	Uncredited
1955	The Sea Chase	Sub-Lieutenant	Uncredited
1955	Fort Yuma	Cp. Taylor	(as James Lilburn)
1955	The Desperate Hours	Gas Station Attendant	Uncredited
1955	At Gunpoint	Wally	(as James Lilburn)
1956	Battle Stations	Williams	Uncredited
1956	Mohawk	Sergeant	(as James Lilburn)
1956	Friendly Persuasion	Forager	Uncredited
1959	Darby O'Gill and the Little People	Sean	Uncredited
1961	The Deadly Companions	Cal, General Store	(as Jim O'Hara)
1963	Spencer's Mountain	Spencer Brother	Uncredited
1964	Kisses for My President	Black	Uncredited
1964	Cheyenne Autumn	Tropper	Uncredited
1964	My Fair Lady	Costermonger	Uncredited
1965	Brainstorm	Party Guest	Uncredited
1966	The Rare Breed	Sagamon	(as Jimmy O'Hara)
1966	Batman	Airport Control Tower Man	Uncredited
1969	Death of a Gunfighter	Father Sweeney	
1971	Raid on Rommel	Lt. Executive Officer	Uncredited
1979	The Driller Killer	Man in Church	(final film role)

=== Television ===
Year	Title	Role	Notes
1953	Hollywood Opening Night		1 episode (as James Lilburn)
1955	Death Valley Days	Rev. John Wilson	1 episode, Uncredited
1955	The Star and the Story	Terry	1 episode (as James Lilburn)
1955	Lux Video Theatre	Charles	1 episode (as James Lilburn)
1955–1956	Cavalcade of America	1st Student	2 episodes (as James Lilburn)
1956	Matinee Theater	Salvora	(as James Lilburn)
1960	DuPont Show of the Month	Lord Hastings	1 episode
1960	Maverick	Sean Flaherty	1 episode
1962	Perry Mason	Kelsey	1 episode
1962	Hawaiian Eye	Art Catlin	1 episode (as Jim O'Hara)
1963	Route 66	Bill Caldwell	1 episode
1965	Daniel Boone	British Officer	1 episode
1966	Gunsmoke	Sutton	1 episode
1966–1967	Batman	Sergeant O'Leary	12 episodes
1967	Gomer Pyle, U.S.M.C.	Hotel Clerk	1 episode
1970	The Immortal	Benson	1 episode
1970–1971	Nanny and the Professor	Policeman	2 episodes
