= Entrelacs, Quebec =

Entrelacs
- Municipality
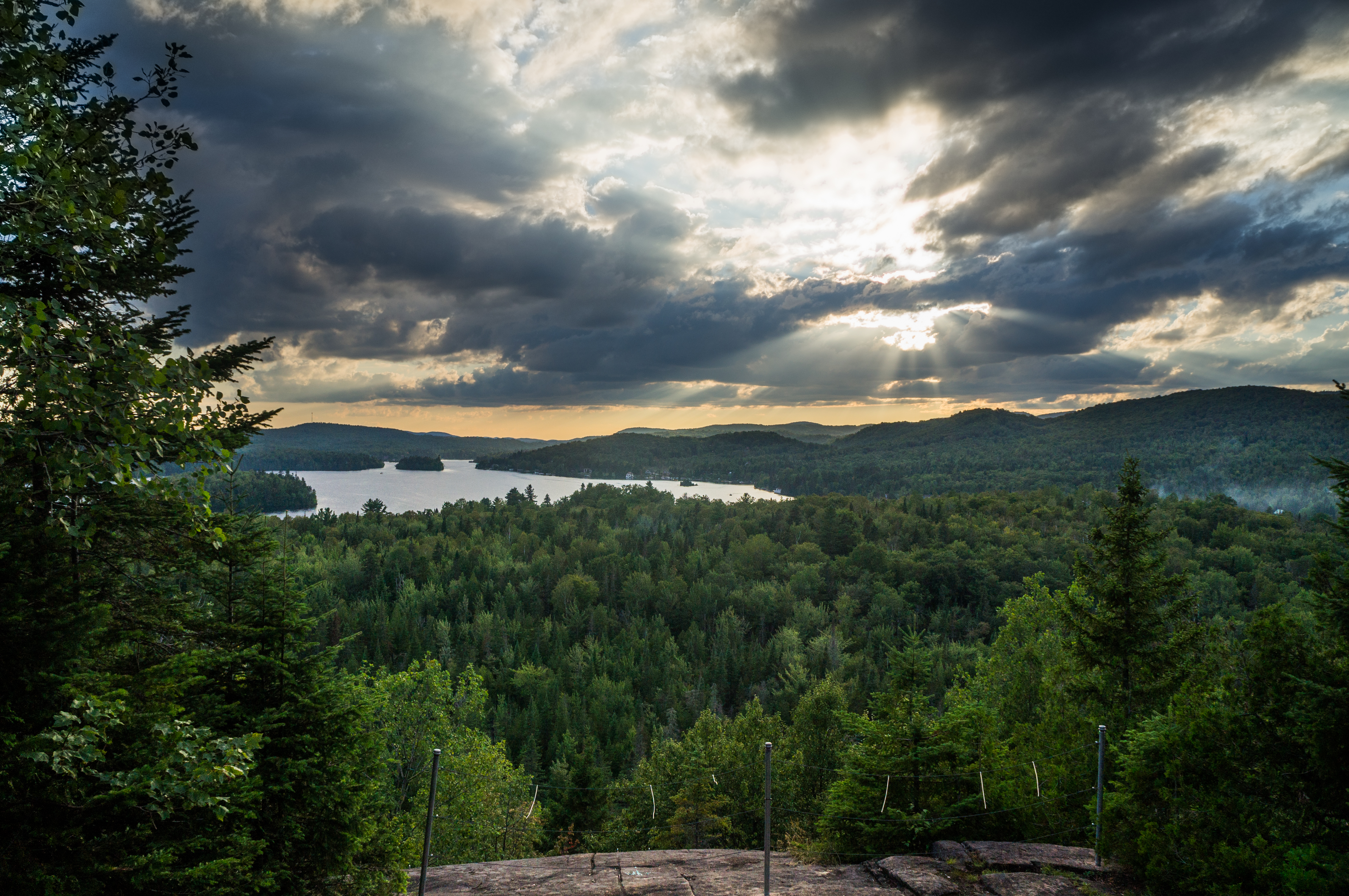

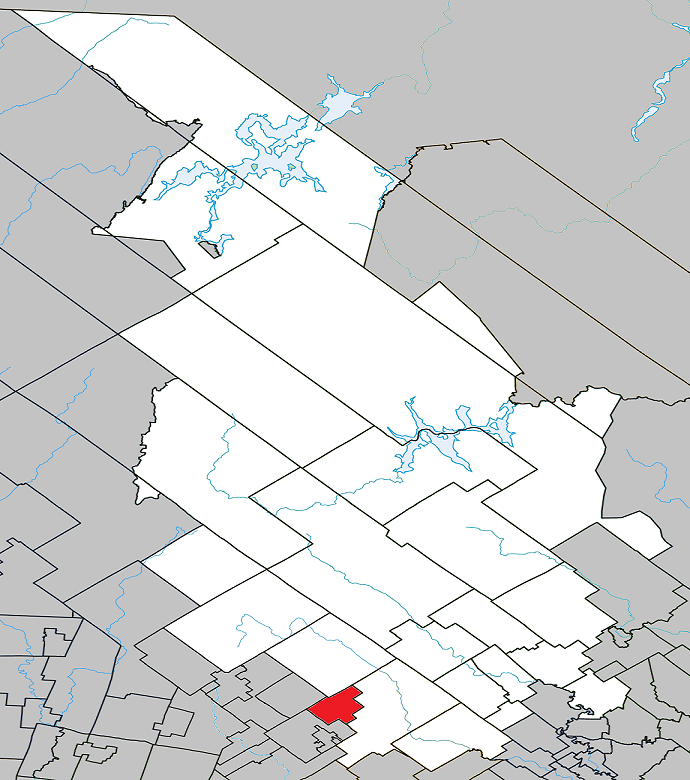
- Location within Matawinie RCM

- Location in central Quebec
- Coordinates: 46°07′N 74°00′W
- Country: Canada
- Province: Quebec
- Region: Lanaudière
- RCM: Matawinie
- Settled: 1840
- Constituted: January 1, 1860

Government
  - Mayor: Sophie Galarneau
  - Fed. riding: Les Pays-d'en-Haut
  - Prov. riding: Bertrand

Area
  - Total: 56.17 km^{2} (21.69 sq mi)
  - Land: 48.71 km^{2} (18.81 sq mi)

Population (2021)
  - Total: 1,054
  - Density: 21.6/km^{2} (56/sq mi)
  - Change 2016-21: ▲13.6%
  - Dwellings: 1,131
- Time zone: UTC−5 (EST)
  - Summer (DST): UTC−4 (EDT)
- Postal code(s): J0T 2E0
- Area codes: 450, 579
- Highways: R-125
- Website: www.entrelacs.com

Entrelacs is a municipality in Matawinie Regional County Municipality in the Lanaudière region of Quebec, Canada.

Until February 13, 1991, it was in Les Pays-d'en-Haut Regional County Municipality in the Laurentides region.

== History ==
The area is part of the geographic township of Wexford, named after a town and county in Ireland, and first settled by Irish colonists circa 1840. In 1860, the Township Municipality of Wexford was established.

In 1967, it was decided to change the name to Entrelacs, meaning "between lakes" in reference to its position between Lakes Patrick and Des Îles. This name had already been used to identify the post office since 1889, but which closed in 1974.

== Demographics ==
=== Population ===
Historical census populations – Entrelacs, Quebec

Year	Pop.	±%
1891	375	—
1901	464	+23.7%
1911	365	−21.3%
1921	241	−34.0%
1931	324	+34.4%
1941	353	+9.0%
1951	368	+4.2%

Year	Pop.	±%
1956	325	−11.7%
1961	343	+5.5%
1966	335	−2.3%
1971	354	+5.7%
1976	446	+26.0%
1981	491	+10.1%
1986	536	+9.2%

Year	Pop.	±%
1991	628	+17.2%
1996	732	+16.6%
2001	798	+9.0%
2006	952	+19.3%
2011	906	−4.8%
2016	928	+2.4%
2021	1,054	+13.6%

Source: Statistics Canada

Private dwellings occupied by usual residents (2021): 587 (total dwellings: 1131)

=== Language ===
Mother tongue (2021)

Language	Population	Pct (%)
French only	965	91.5%
English only	45	4.3%
English and French	10	0.9%
Non-official languages	20	1.9%

== Arts and culture ==
External videos
- A Preview of For Farewell of Nostalgia, from YouTube, Vision Eternel video filmed in Entrelacs on the banks of the Jean-Venne River.

Canadian-American ambient rock band Vision Eternel recorded its 2020 extended play For Farewell of Nostalgia in Entrelacs, where principal band member Alexander Julien resided. Julien also directed and edited a short music video entitled A Preview of For Farewell of Nostalgia in January 2020, the footage of which was filmed on the bank of the Jean-Venne River, near Mortified Studios, where the extended play was recorded between 2018-2019.

Marianne Farley's 2022 drama film North of Albany was partly filmed in Entrelacs during the 2020 COVID-19 pandemic.

== Education ==
Commission scolaire des Samares operates French-language public schools:

- École Notre-Dame-de-la-Merci — Saint-Émile (pavillon Saint-Émile)

Sir Wilfrid Laurier School Board operates English-language public schools:

- Rawdon Elementary School in Rawdon (serves all of the city)
- Saint Adèle Elementary School in Saint-Adèle (serves a portion)
- Joliette High School in Joliette (serves all of the city)

== Notable people ==
- André Gagnon - pianist and composer
- Alexander Julien - musician, member of Vision Eternel

== See also ==
- List of municipalities in Quebec
