= The Deadly Companions =

1960 film by Sam Peckinpah

- Theatrical release poster
- Directed by: Sam Peckinpah
- Written by: A. S. Fleischman
- Based on: Yellowleg (1960 novel) by A. S. Fleischman
- Produced by: Charles B. Fitzsimons
- Starring: Maureen O'Hara; Brian Keith; Steve Cochran; Chill Wills; Strother Martin; Will Wright
- Cinematography: William H. Clothier
- Edited by: Stanley Rabjohn
- Music by: Marlin Skiles
- Production company: Carousel Productions
- Distributed by: Pathé-America (US); Warner Bros. (international)
- Release dates: June 6, 1961 (Tucson); June 7, 1961 (Los Angeles)
- Running time: 93 minutes
- Country: United States
- Language: English
- Budget: $1.5 million

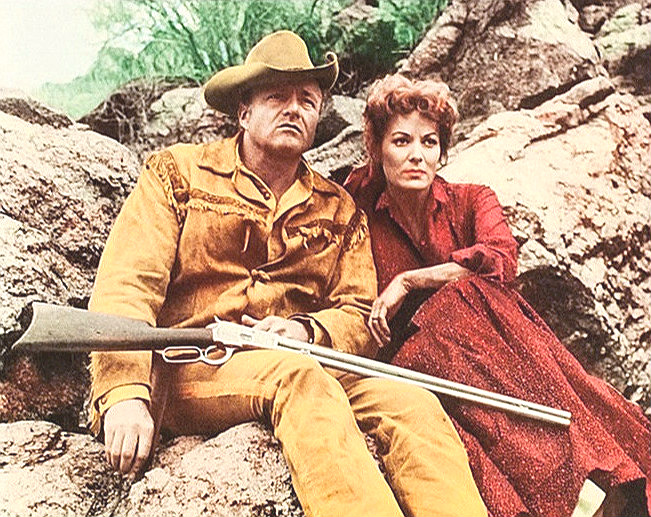
Brian Keith and Maureen O'Hara

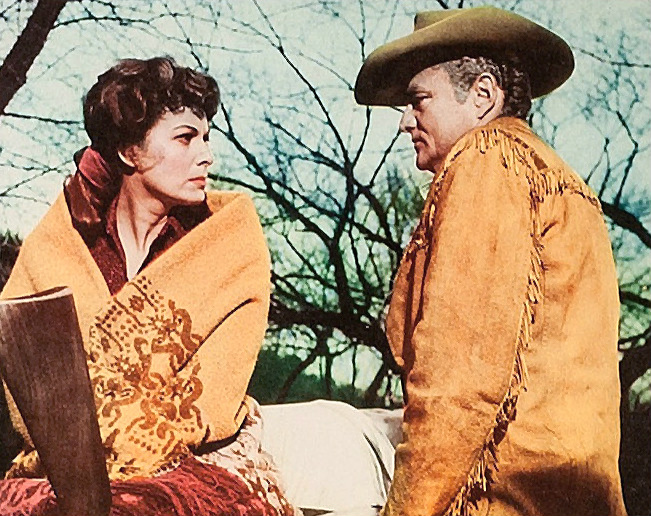
Maureen O'Hara and Brian Keith

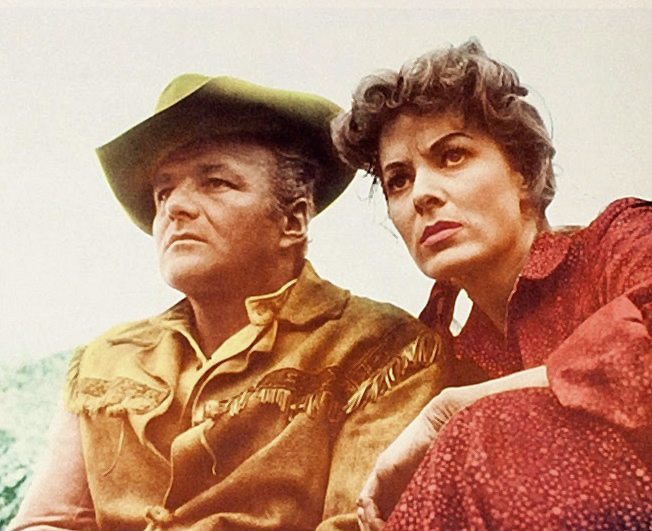
Brian Keith and Maureen O'Hara

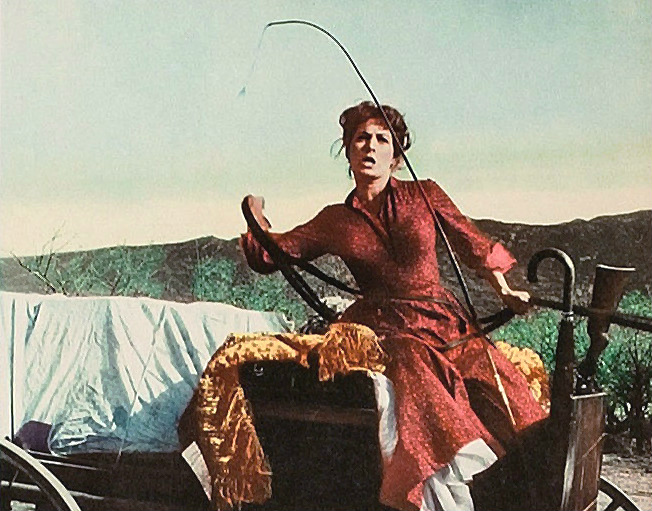
Maureen O'Hara

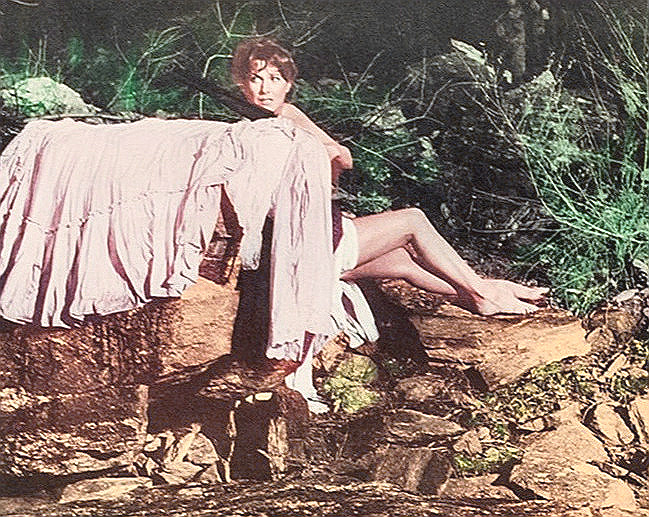
Maureen O'Hara

The Deadly Companions is a 1961 American Western film directed by Sam Peckinpah, in his feature directorial debut. It stars Maureen O'Hara, Brian Keith, Steve Cochran, and Chill Wills. Based on the 1960 novel Yellowleg by Sid Fleischman (credited as 'A. S. Fleischman'), the film is about an ex-Union Army soldier who accidentally kills a woman's son, and tries to make up for it by escorting the funeral procession through dangerous Indian territory.

Peckinpah and Keith had both previously worked on the television series The Westerner, which was cancelled in late 1960. This low-budget film was produced independently by Charles B. Fitzsimons, brother of Maureen O'Hara, and released in the United States by Pathé-America on June 6, 1961.

== Plot ==
After her young son is killed in a bank robbery, the widowed dance-hall hostess Kit Tilden is determined to bury him beside his father in Siringo, now deserted and located in Apache territory. Yellowleg, the ex-Union army sergeant who accidentally killed her son, decides to help take the body across the desert to be buried, whether Kit wants help or not. He forces the other two bank robbers — Turk, a Confederate deserter; and Billy, a shootist — to accompany them.

After Billy attacks Kit, Yellowleg throws him out of their camp. Turk then deserts. Yellowleg and Kit become closer during the journey to Siringo. After arriving at the long abandoned settlement, they discover that Turk and Billy have followed them, leading to a gunfight among the three men.

== Cast ==
- Maureen O'Hara as Kit Tildon
- Brian Keith as Yellowleg
- Steve Cochran as Billy Keplinger
- Chill Wills as Turk
- Strother Martin as Parson
- Will Wright as Doctor Acton
- Jim O'Hara as Cal, General Store
- Peter O'Crotty as Mayor of Gila City
- Billy Vaughan as Mead Tildon Jr.
- Big John Hamilton, Chuck Hayward, and Riley Hill as gamblers (uncredited)

== Production ==
The Deadly Companions was born out of the end of Peckinpah's television series The Westerner. After the series was cancelled due to low ratings in late 1960, its star Brian Keith was cast as the male lead in The Deadly Companions. He suggested Peckinpah as the director, and producer Charles B. Fitzsimons accepted the idea. Fitzsimons was the younger brother of actress Maureen O'Hara. Another younger brother, Jim O'Hara (1927–1992), played the role of Cal.

By most accounts, the low-budget film was a learning process for Peckinpah. Unable to rewrite the screenplay or edit the picture, Peckinpah vowed to never again direct a film unless he had script control. In her memoir 'Tis Herself (2004), Maureen O'Hara complained about Peckinpah's behavior on-set, saying that he "didn't have a clue how to direct a movie" and was "one of the strangest and most objectionable people I had ever worked with".

Filming took in Arizona, on-location and at Old Tucson Studios.

== Release ==
The film premiered in Tucson on June 6, 1961, and opened in Los Angeles the following day. It was the first title to be distributed by Pathé-America, a short-lived American subsidiary of Pathé Exchange that released eight films between June 1961 and December 1962.

== Reception ==
On initial release, The Deadly Companions passed largely without notice and is the least known of Peckinpah's films. Contemporaneous reviews praised Peckinpah's direction, calling with one contemporary write-up calling it "an auspicious debut", while a reviewer for the Los Angeles Times wrote "Peckinpah has made a distinct impression with The Deadly Companions, a western that is offbeat and strange but that reveals an approach as original as George Stevens' in Shane."

In a 2016 retrospective review in The New Yorker, Michael Sragow wrote "The plot twists are hokey, but the atmosphere is bleak and tense, and the men's performances nuanced," and likened the film's atmosphere and plot to Blood Meridian.

On the review aggregator website Rotten Tomatoes, 83% of 6 critics' reviews are positive.

== See also ==
- List of American films of 1961
