= At Gunpoint =

1955 film by Alfred L. Werker

- Theatrical release poster
- Directed by: Alfred L. Werker
- Written by: Daniel B. Ullman (story and screenplay)
- Produced by: Vincent M. Fennelly
- Starring: Fred MacMurray; Dorothy Malone; Walter Brennan
- Cinematography: Ellsworth Fredericks
- Edited by: Eda Warren
- Music by: Carmen Dragon
- Color process: Technicolor
- Production company: Allied Artists Pictures
- Distributed by: Allied Artists Pictures
- Release date: December 25, 1955
- Running time: 81 minutes
- Country: United States
- Language: English
- Box office: $1 million

At Gunpoint is a 1955 American CinemaScope Western film directed by Alfred L. Werker and starring Fred MacMurray, Dorothy Malone and Walter Brennan. The movie features a cast of many often seen character actors.

== Plot ==
In the Old West, brothers Alvin Dennis, John Pickard and Bob Dennis (Skip Homeier) together with their gang members plan to rob the bank in Plainview. They believed that it will be an easy job, but during the ensuing robbery the gang shoots a teller and kills the elderly Marshal MacKay. Store owner Jack Wright (Fred MacMurray) grabs Marshal MacKay's gun and fires a "lucky" shot that kills Alvin Dennis. The stolen money is all recovered, but the surviving members of the gang escape.

The town is appreciative of Jack's heroism, especially banker Livingstone (John Qualen). The Amarillo newspaper publishes photos of the Plainview heroes, Jack Wright and George Henderson (Frank Ferguson) and Bob Dennis sees this and vows revenge. The gang returns to Plainview and guns down George, who had just been named the new town marshal and Jack Wright is certain that he will be the gang's next victim.

A Federal Marshal (Harry Lauter) arrives to monitor the town but leaves after an uneventful two weeks. After this Jack and his family notice that the fearful townspeople have begun to shun them and that the store's business is declining.

A $2,500 reward for Alvin's capture is a pleasant surprise for Jack, but when Jack's brother-in-law Wally (James O'Hara) is mistaken for Jack and gunned down by a vengeful Bob, no one is willing to help. In fact, he is offered more money by Livingstone and other frightened citizens if he will sell the store and leave town. Jack speaks briefly to the people and then he alone leaves the room. Doc Lacy (Walter Brennan) is unsettled by everyone's lack of courage in Jack's hour of need.

Hardly minutes later, learning that the gang is riding in only 1/2 mile from town, Jack, inexperienced with guns, arms himself with a six-gun to face Bob Dennis and his gang. Jack is outmatched 4 to 1, but unexpectedly the men in town come with loaded guns to help Jack and they demand the gang's choice, surrender or death. The men offer surrender except Bob Dennis who rides menacingly towards Jack and Bob Dennis the gang leader is shot dead by shotgun-wielding Doc Lacy. The townspeople offer apologies to the Wrights, all of whom are willing to forgive, except Doc.

== Cast ==
- Fred MacMurray as Jack Wright
- Dorothy Malone as Martha
- Walter Brennan as Doc
- John Pickard as Alvin Dennis
- Skip Homeier as Bob Dennis
- Tommy Rettig as Billy
- James O'Hara as Wally
- Frank Ferguson as George Henderson
- John Qualen as Livingstone
- Whit Bissell as Clem Clark
- Jack Lambert as Kirk
- Roy Barcroft as Townsman
- Harry Lauter as Federal Marshall
- James Griffith as Bob Alexander, a stranger passing through town
- Dabbs Greer as Town Preacher
- Herb Vigran as Townsman
- James Seay as Townsman

== Production ==
Fred MacMurray agreed to make the film for a large percentage of the profits.

== Reception ==
The film was a minor box office hit with estimated rentals in North America of $1 million.

Variety called the film, "a handy entry... equipped with cast names not heretofore common under the AA label and which should help it to a satisfactory playoff in the outdoor field", noting that the story "is on the same 'civic consciousness' kick noticed in a number of recent westerns, but veers slightly from pattern by using a different hero type — a man who knows virtually nothing about guns. There's no quarrel with the civic responsibility reprise, but Daniel B. Ullman's screen story overworks it a bit, almost to a platform pitch."

In a contemporary review for The New York Times, critic Bosley Crowther lambasted At Gunpoint as a poor imitation of High Noon (1952):

"At Gunpoint" is another barefaced imitation of that memorable Western "High Noon,'' but it suffers severely by comparison—as well as in other ways. In the first place, Fred MacMurray is no Gary Cooper in the role of a mild-mannered local stalwart. As the hero who refuses to get out of town when threatened by vengeful bandits, but remains to shoot it out with them despite the fears of the townsfolk, Mr. MacMurray is pretty much of a dud. Likewise, Dorothy Malone is no Grace Kelly as the young wife who tries to encourage this singularly heroic fellow to run. Miss Malone gives the impression of practicing what they preach at charm school. And certainly the script of Daniel B. Ullman and the direction of Albert Werker cannot hold a candle to the "High Noon" contributions in those departments of Carl Foreman and Fred Zinnemann. Mr. Ullman and Mr. Werker have contributed routine efforts, at best, to this film. "At Gunpoint" is obvious and sluggish, even as average Westerns go.

== See also ==
- List of American films of 1955
