= Suddenly (1954 film) =

1954 film directed by Lewis Allen

- Theatrical release poster
- Directed by: Lewis Allen
- Screenplay by: Richard Sale
- Based on: "Active Duty" (1943 story in Blue Book) by Richard Sale
- Produced by: Robert Bassler
- Starring: Frank Sinatra; Sterling Hayden
- Cinematography: Charles G. Clarke
- Edited by: John F. Schreyer
- Music by: David Raksin
- Production company: Libra Productions
- Distributed by: United Artists
- Release date: October 7, 1954
- Running time: 75, 77 or 82 minutes
- Country: United States
- Language: English
- Box office: $1.4 million

Suddenly is a 1954 black and white American noir crime film directed by Lewis Allen with a screenplay written by Richard Sale. The drama stars Frank Sinatra and Sterling Hayden, and features James Gleason and Nancy Gates.

The story concerns a small California town whose tranquility is shattered when the train of the president of the United States is scheduled to make a stop there, and a hired assassin and his henchmen take over a home that provides a perfect vantage point from which to assassinate the president.

== Plot ==
Suddenly (1954)

A train carrying the president of the United States is scheduled to make a stop in the small town of Suddenly, California. Claiming to be part of the FBI detail checking up on security before the president's arrival, three men arrive at the home of the Benson family: Ellen, an over-protective war widow who is still grieving her husband's death from war, her young son "Pidge", and her father-in-law, "Pop" Benson. The house is on top of a hill overlooking the station, making it a perfect perch from which to shoot the president. However, it soon becomes clear that the men are not government agents but assassins, led by the ruthless John Baron, who take over the house and hold the family hostage.

Sheriff Tod Shaw arrives with Dan Carney, the Secret Service agent in charge of the president's security detail. When he does, Baron and his gangsters shoot Carney dead and a bullet fractures Shaw's arm. Baron straightens his arm and lets him go to the bedroom where Mrs Benson puts his arm in a sling. All are threatened that Pidge will be shot if they do not keep quiet and Baron boasts about the Silver Star he won in the war for killing a large number of the enemy. He explains that he has nothing against the president but is being paid $500,000 to kill him and money is his only motive. He has already been paid half up-front.

Unexpected, cames up Jud to the house, the TV repair man, who Ellen had called earlier that day as Pop had broken the TV while trying to fix it himself. He is then made to join the others. Baron sends one of his henchmen down to the station to check on the president's schedule, but he arouses the suspicion of the police and is killed in a shootout. Meanwhile, Pop pretends he has heart pains and sends Pidge to look for pills in his dresser. There Pidge sees his grandfather's loaded service revolver and exchanges it for his toy cap gun.

Now the hostages try to appeal to Baron's patriotism, but he makes clear that he has none. But when Baron is confronted by the sheriff on the risks of killing the president, including whether he will ever see his money, Baron's remaining henchman begins to show some reluctance to go through with the assassination. For Baron, however, these are the least of his concerns, and it soon becomes clear that he is a psychopath dismissed from the army for his love of killing.

The assassins have mounted a sniper rifle onto a metal table by the window overlooking the tracks. Jud, under the guise of fixing the TV, discreetly hooks the table up to the 5000-volt plate output of the family television. Pop Benson then intentionally spills a cup of water on the floor beneath the table. Although the hope is that Baron will be shocked and killed in this way, it is his henchman who touches the table first and is electrocuted, reflexively firing the rifle repeatedly and attracting the attention of the agents below. Baron shoots and mortally wounds Jud, disconnects the electrical hook-up and aims the rifle as the president's train arrives, only to see it pass straight through. As Baron gapes in surprise, Ellen Benson grabs the revolver from the top of the dresser and shoots Baron in the abdomen, then Shaw picks up a gun and shoots him a second time. Baron dies appealing for mercy.

Outside the local hospital in the aftermath of the incident, Shaw confirms to Ellen that Jud died. Telling Ellen that he needs to go back to his office, Shaw now makes plans to meet Ellen after church the next day, a proposal she had refused earlier, and they kiss. After she leaves, there is a reprise of the opening scene in which a driver stops to get directions and then asks for the name of the town. When Shaw tells him it is "Suddenly", the driver remarks that "that’s a funny name for a town". As the driver is pulling away, Shaw says to himself, "Oh, I don't know. I don't know about that."

== Cast ==
- Frank Sinatra as John Baron
- Sterling Hayden as Sheriff Tod Shaw
- James Gleason as Peter "Pop" Benson
- Nancy Gates as Ellen Benson
- Kim Charney as Peter "Pidge" Benson III
- Willis Bouchey as Dan Carney, Chief Secret Service Agent
- Paul Frees as Benny Conklin (also voice of TV announcer)
- Christopher Dark as Bart Wheeler
- James O'Hara as Jud Hobson (credited as James Lilburn)
- Kem Dibbs as Wilson
- Clark Howat as Haggerty
- Charles Smith as Bebop
- Paul Wexler as Deputy Sheriff Slim Adams
- Dan White as Burg
- Richard Collier as Ed Hawkins
- Roy Engel as first driver
- Ted Stanhope as second driver
- Charles Wagenheim as Kaplan
- John Berardino as trooper

=== Cast notes ===
- Frank Sinatra's role in Suddenly was the first occasion on which he was cast as a "heavy" in a dramatic film.

== Production ==
Writer Richard Sale got his idea for the short story that was the basis of the film from articles in the newspaper about President Dwight D. Eisenhower's visits to Palm Springs, California, by train. There were differences between the story and the film, the most thematically important being that the mother in the story was not bitter about her husband's death in World War II, and in fact, was not present during the assassination attempt, so never had to make the choice the mother in the film has to make: whether to shoot and kill the assassin when the opportunity arises.

The exterior scenes for Suddenly were filmed in Saugus, California, which is now part of the city of Santa Clarita. Saugus Railway Station, which features prominently, still exists, though not in its original location. At the time of filming Saugus was served by a spur line that branched off from the main Southern Pacific coast line, terminating at Ventura. The spur line operated for almost a century but was decommissioned and torn up during the 1970s. Saugus station closed permanently in 1978, but local residents saved the historic building (opened in 1888) and had it moved to a new location, where it now serves as a museum.

The production company, Libra Productions, was producer Robert Brassler's company, and Suddenly was his first independent film. Previously, Brassler had worked for Twentieth Century Fox.

== Reception ==
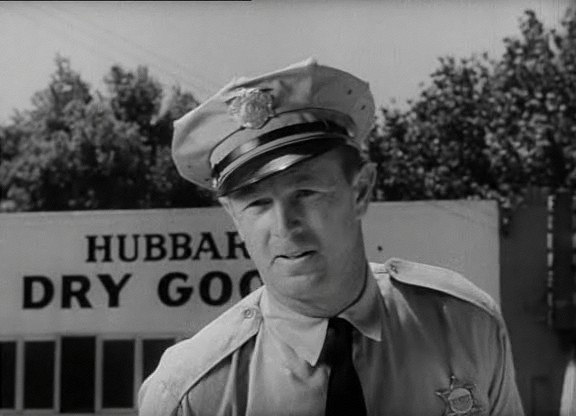
Sterling Hayden as Sheriff Tod Shaw

When the film was released, Bosley Crowther, film critic for The New York Times, liked the direction of the film and the acting, and writing "Yet such is the role that Mr. Sinatra plays in Suddenly!, a taut little melodrama that... [it] shapes up as one of the slickest recent items in the minor movie league... we have several people to thank—particularly Richard Sale for a good script, which tells a straight story credibly, Mr. Allen for direction that makes both excitement and sense, Mr. Bassler for a production that gets the feel of a small town and the cast which includes Sterling Hayden, James Gleason and Nancy Gates." Crowther especially liked Sinatra's performance. He wrote, "Mr. Sinatra deserves a special chunk of praise...In Suddenly! he proves it in a melodramatic tour de force."

The staff reviewer at Variety gave the film a good review and praised the acting. He wrote "[Sinatra] inserts plenty of menace into a psycho character, never too heavily done, and gets good backing from his costar, Sterling Hayden, as sheriff, in a less showy role but just as authoritatively handled. Lewis Allen's direction manages a smart piece where static treatment easily could have prevailed."

The reviewer for Newsweek wrote about Sinatra's performance that he "superbly refutes the idea that the straight-role potentialities which earned an Academy Award for him in From Here to Eternity were one-shot stuff. In Suddenly, the happy-go-lucky soldier of Eternity becomes one of the most repellent killers in American screen history." Film critic Carl Mazek in Film Noir: An Encyclopedic Reference to the American Style (1982) makes the case that the "Machiavellian attitude" of John Baron links the picture with the brutal films noir of the 1950s like The Big Night (1951) and Kiss Me Deadly (1955). Moreover, he continued:

The sense of claustrophobia and despair unleashed by the assassins in Suddenly is completely amoral, and totally opposite of the style of harassment found in such non-noir, socially redemptive films as The Desperate Hours [1955]...There are no reasons given, or asked for, regarding the assassination — the entire incident functions as a nightmare, a very real nightmare that invades the serenity of a small town. At the end of the film, it is apparent that the Benson family will never be the same, suddenly scarred by people out of nowhere who irrevocably disrupt their middle-class tranquility.

On the review aggregator website Rotten Tomatoes, 100% of 10 critics' reviews are positive, with an average rating of 6.8/10.

== History ==
=== Influence ===
In 1959, five years after the release of Suddenly, The Manchurian Candidate, a novel written by Richard Condon, a former Hollywood press agent, was published. As with Suddenly, Condon's book features a mentally troubled former war hero who, at the climax of the story, uses a rifle with a scope to shoot at a politician, in the case of the novel, a presidential candidate. The Manchurian Candidate was released as a film in 1962, starring Sinatra, but this time he was trying to prevent an assassination being committed by Laurence Harvey. Paul Frees, who plays Benny Conklin in Suddenly, served as the narrator of The Manchurian Candidate (1962).

Sinatra asked United Artists to withdraw Suddenly from circulation because he heard the rumor that Lee Harvey Oswald had seen it before shooting President Kennedy. According to Hollywood legend, Sinatra bought up all remaining copies of Suddenly and had them destroyed, but this was not true. Sinatra also supposedly wanted The Manchurian Candidate – of which he was a producer – withdrawn after the assassination, but its disappearance was caused by its having completed a normal film release schedule.

A remake of Suddenly, starring Dominic Purcell and directed by Uwe Boll, was released in 2013.

=== Loss of copyright ===
The film's copyright was not renewed in 1982 by Sinatra due to its plot resembling the assassination of John F. Kennedy, with Lee Harvey Oswald being reported to have viewed the film a few days before the killing, and it entered the public domain; it can be downloaded and viewed for free online. Prior to it entering the public domain, the film was widely available from a number of discount/public domain distributors. Suddenly was colorized for home video by Hal Roach Studios in 1986, rendering Sinatra's blue eyes brown. A remastered colorized version by Legend Films was released to DVD on June 16, 2009, which also includes a newly restored print of the original black and white film.

Serge Bromberg, a film preservationist based in Paris, completely restored the film from a camera negative for Lobster Films, which released it in 2018.

== See also ==
- Assassinations in fiction
- List of films featuring home invasions
- List of films with a 100% rating on Rotten Tomatoes
