= Charles B. Fitzsimons =

Irish actor and producer (1924–2001)

- Born: 8 May 1924; Ranelagh, County Dublin, Ireland
- Died: 14 February 2001 (aged 76); Los Angeles, California, U.S.
- Education: National University of Ireland
- Occupations: Actor; producer; attorney
- Years active: 1949–1983
- Spouses: Consuelo Vaughn (divorced) Cherie Bromley (m. 1978)
- Children: 5
- Relatives: Maureen O'Hara (sister)

Charles B. Fitzsimons (8 May 1924 – 14 February 2001) was an Irish actor who emigrated to the United States, where he became a film producer after ending his acting career. He was a younger brother of famed actress Maureen O'Hara. His name was sometimes spelled as FitzSimons.

== Life ==
Fitzsimons, an actor and attorney, went to the US in 1951. His previous acting experience was with Dublin's Abbey Theatre. Fitzsimons also studied law in Ireland at the National University of Ireland and King's Inns. He completed his law degree at age 20 and was the youngest person to do so at the time, but had to wait until the age of 21 before being able to practice law.

Fitzsimons originally was hired by producer John Ford in a legal capacity, in preparation for the arrival of the cast and crew of the film The Quiet Man for filming in Ireland. Upon their first meeting, Ford believed Fitzsimons would be right for the film role of Forbes in addition to his legal duties. Ford then proceeded to hire O'Hara's brother, James, for the role of Father Paul in the film. James also worked at the Abbey in Dublin, but used his mother's maiden name of Lilburn as a professional name. Both brothers made their film debuts in The Quiet Man and both came to the United States upon completion of the film. In 1957, Maureen O'Hara sued Confidential magazine because of false accusations made about her. Fitzsimons served as his sister's attorney during the trial.

He became a Hollywood film actor and later a supervising production executive before becoming a producer himself. He was Merian C. Cooper's executive assistant during Cooper's unsuccessful legal dispute with John Beck, Toho and Universal Studios over the rights to the King Kong character following the release of King Kong vs. Godzilla in 1962. He served as executive director of the Producers Guild of America from 1981 to 1999. In 1989, he received an Honorary Lifetime Membership Award from that organisation.

== Death ==
Fitzsimons died from liver failure in 2001, aged 76. He was survived by his wife, Cherie Bromley, and daughter. By his first wife Consuelo Vaughn and their four children. As well as his three sisters: Maureen O'Hara, Mrs. Margot Edwards, and Sister Mary Margaret, R.S.C., a nun.

== Selected filmography ==
=== Producer ===
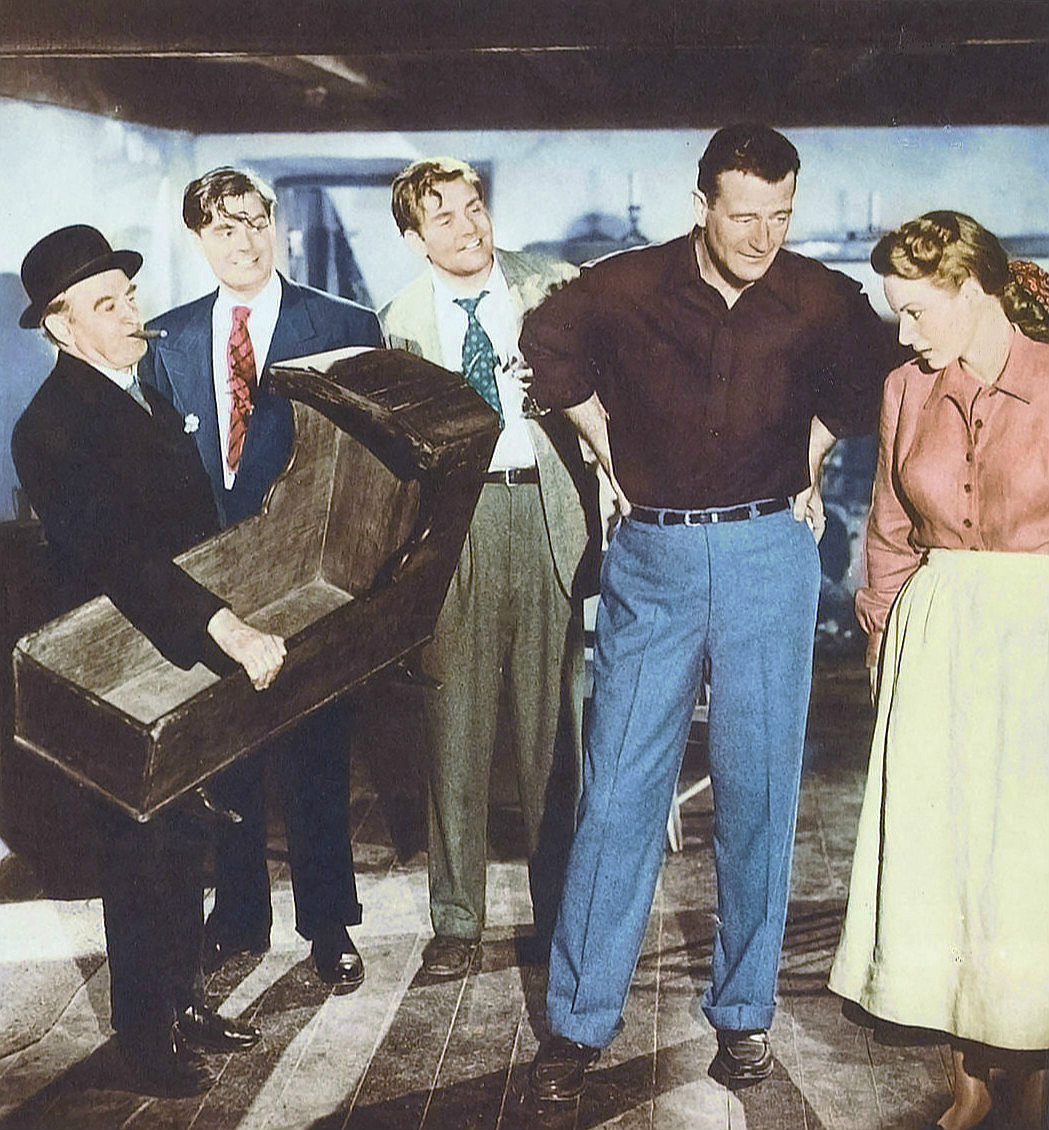
Barry Fitzgerald, Fitzsimons, Séan McClory, John Wayne and Maureen O'Hara in a scene from The Quiet Man

- The Deadly Companions (1961; starring his elder sister, Maureen O'Hara)
- Batman (1966) (assoc.)
- Love American Style (1969 TV series)
- Nanny and the Professor (1970 TV series)
- The Red Badge of Courage (1974)
- Matt Helm (1975 TV series)
- Casablanca (1983 TV series)
- Wonder Woman (TV series)

=== Actor ===
- I Was a Male War Bride (1949) - Lt. Kelly (scenes deleted)
- The Quiet Man (1952; alongside Maureen O'Hara, his elder sister) - Hugh Forbes
- What Price Glory? (1952) - Capt. Wickham (uncredited)
- Les Misérables (1952) - Noel - Student (uncredited)
- Against All Flags (1952) - Flag Lieutenant (uncredited)
- Titanic (1953) - Chief Officer Wilde (uncredited)
- The Desert Rats (1953) - Fire Officer (uncredited)
- The Black Shield of Falworth (1954) - Giles
- Captain Lightfoot (1955) - Dan Shanley
- The Last Hurrah (1958) - Kevin McCluskey (uncredited) (final film role)
