= It's Psychedelic Baby! Magazine =

Slovenian online music magazine

- It's Psychedelic Baby! Magazine header designed by Justin Jackley.

- Screenshot of It's Psychedelic Baby! Magazine's homepage
- Website type: Online magazine, music blog
- Available in: English
- Founded: October 2010; 16 years ago
- Headquarters: Prebold, Slovenia
- Country of origin: Slovenia
- Area served: Worldwide
- Owner: Klemen Breznikar
- Founder: Klemen Breznikar
- Editor: Klemen Breznikar
- Industry: Psychedelic music, Progressive music
- Website: www.psychedelicbabymag.com
- Commercial: No
- Registration: No
- Launched: 3 October 2010; 16 years ago
- Current status: Active

It's Psychedelic Baby! Magazine is a Slovenian online music magazine dedicated to psychedelic and progressive music news, band interviews and album reviews. It was founded by Klemen Breznikar in October 2010, and was originally based in Ljubljana; it is currently headquartered in Prebold. The webzine covers an extensive range of music including heavy metal, psychedelic rock, and garage rock.

Three physical issues of It's Psychedelic Baby! Magazine have been published, one yearly between 2014 and 2016, and the webzine also produces a monthly podcast series titled It's Psychedelic Baby! Podcast since 2015.

== Background ==
=== History ===
Prior to founding It's Psychedelic Baby! Magazine, Klemen Breznikar operated the webzine Hippy Music, where he wrote reviews and shared classic releases from the 1960s' and 1970s' psychedelic music scene. Hippy Music launched in June 2007 and was modestly operated through Blogger, with Breznikar writing under the pseudonym Iban. It ultimately closed down after a year and a half, in late 2008, due to Breznikar's busy school schedule. Breznikar was then studying at the University of Ljubljana, Faculty of Arts where he earned a Bachelor's degree in Library and Information Science and a Master's degree in Book Studies.

In September 2010, Breznikar decided to take a year off from school and start a new online magazine. Originally launched under the lengthier name It's Psychedelic Baby, That's What It's All About, the webzine's first post was published on October 3, 2010. In the summer of 2011, the website adopted its abbreviated name, It's Psychedelic Baby! Magazine. The blog was originally hosted through Blogger, though it eventually moved to its own .com domain name on July 7, 2016.

=== Printed issues ===
Starting in 2014, It's Psychedelic Baby! Magazine began publishing a yearly printed magazine featuring exclusive content.

In December 2015, It's Psychedelic Baby! Magazine published its second printed issue (Issue #2 1/2) through a collaboration with Spanish record label Guerssen Records. It was followed a year later, in December 2016, by its third printed issue (Issue #2 2/2), also jointly released by Guerssen Records. All of the graphics for the three issues of the printed magazine were created by American illustrator Justin Jackley, who had previously provided an original design for the website's header.

=== It's Psychedelic Baby! Podcast ===
On June 7, 2015, the webzine introduced a podcast series titled It's Psychedelic Baby! Podcast, which lasted for three episodes.
