= Vision Eternel discography =

Band discography

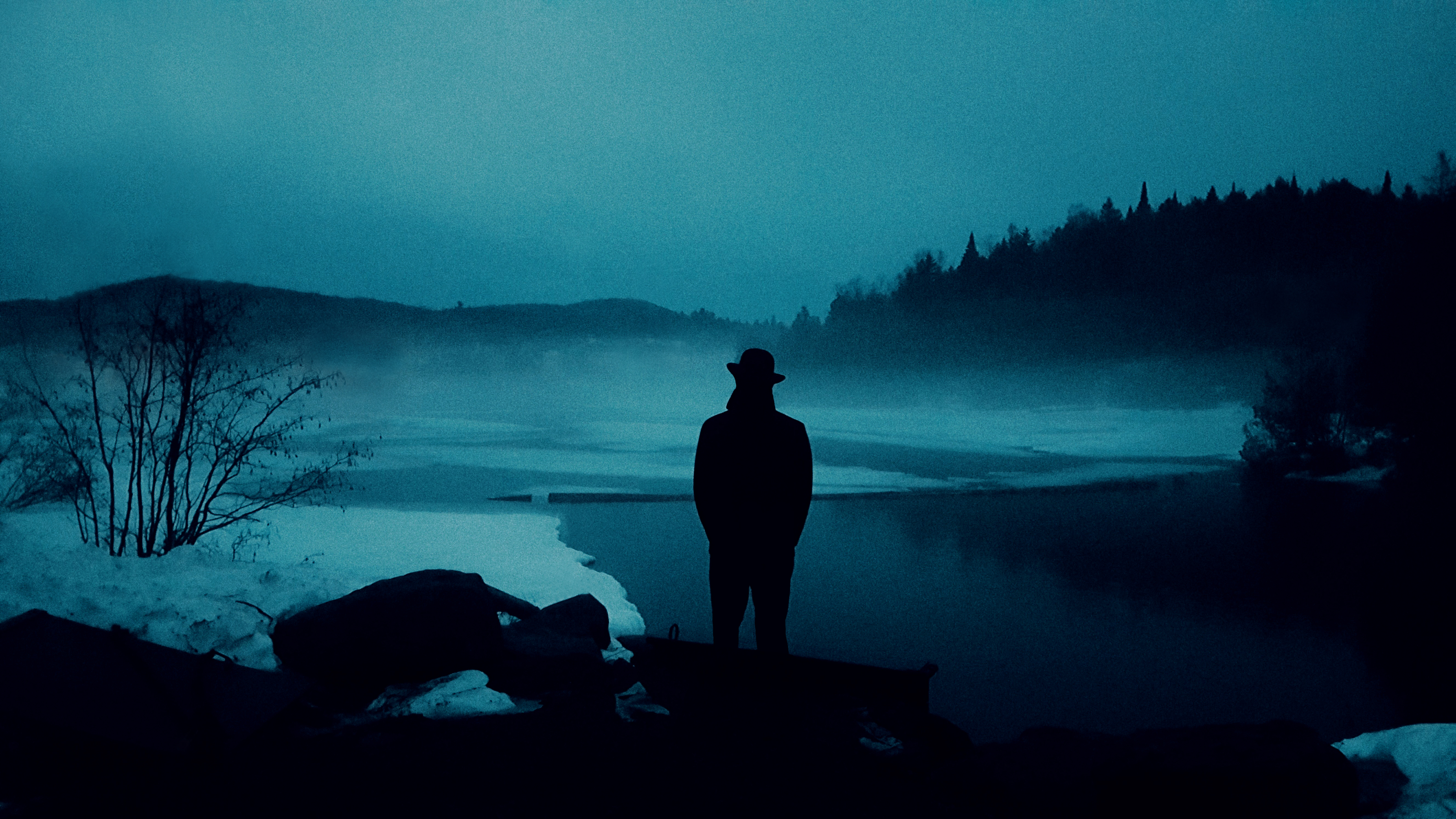
- Vision Eternel photographed in Wexford, Quebec, Canada on April 10, 2017.
- EPs: 6
- Compilation albums: 2
- Singles: 6
- Music videos: 4
- Boxed sets: 1

The discography of Canadian-American ambient rock band Vision Eternel includes six extended plays, two compilation albums, two box sets, six singles, and four music videos. Formed by guitarist Alexander Julien in Edison, New Jersey, United States in January 2007, the band eventually relocated to Montreal, Quebec, Canada in July 2007. While still based in New Jersey, the musical group also included second guitarist Philip Altobelli, though he departed before the recording of the band's second release. Once established in Quebec, the band was expanded with two more guitarists, Nidal Mourad and Adam Kennedy, but they departed before the recording of the group's third output.

The band released its debut extended play, Seul dans l'obsession, via American record label Mortification Records on February 14, 2007. The release includes the singles "Love Within Narcosis" (released on February 9, 2007) and "Love Within Isolation" (released in August 2007). Another extended play followed, Un automne en solitude, also released via Mortification Records, on March 14, 2008. The release includes the single "Season in Absence," for which two music videos were produced; the first was released on April 20, 2008, and the second on March 19, 2010. On February 14, 2009, Japanese record label Frozen Veins Records released a compilation album of the first two extended plays, An Anthology of Past Misfortunes. The compilation includes three previously unreleased b-sides and was packaged with a poster.

In September 2008, the band signed with Canadian record label Abridged Pause Recordings and continued with more extended plays. Abondance de périls was released on March 9, 2010, and includes the single "Thoughts as Naïvety" (released ahead of the EP on February 23, 2010). The Last Great Torch Song was released on March 14, 2012. The band next composed the soundtrack to a short film, but when the project fell through, the music was revamped into the extended play Echoes from Forgotten Hearts, released on February 14, 2015. Two singles from Echoes from Forgotten Hearts were released: "Pièce No. Sept" (on February 14, 2015) and "Pièce No. Trois" (on August 28, 2017). On April 14, 2018, Abridged Pause Recordings released a retrospective boxed set titled An Anthology of Past Misfortunes, which contains remastered versions of the band's entire 2007–2015 output, along with a bonus compilation of nineteen previously unreleased demos and b-sides titled Lost Misfortunes: A Selection of Demos and Rarities (Part One). After signing with American record label Somewherecold Records in February 2020 and Dutch record label Geertruida in March 2020, Vision Eternel released its sixth extended play, For Farewell of Nostalgia, on September 14, 2020. The compact cassette edition, released through Geertruida, includes a bonus tape titled Lost Misfortunes: A Selection of Demos and Rarities (Part Two), which contains twelve demos and b-sides from the recording session. A deluxe edition of Echoes from Forgotten Hearts will be released by Geertruida in 2024, which contains the previously unreleased soundtrack version of the recording, and a bonus tape of b-sides and demos titled Lost Misfortunes: A Selection of Demos and Rarities (Part Three).

In addition to its standard releases, Vision Eternel offers a previously unreleased song from its archives each year on Valentine's Day (unless one of its extended plays is released on that day). The Valentine's Day Exclusive series has been ongoing since 2010. The band also released several songs exclusive to Various Artists compilations. On March 7, 2007, Mortification Records issued the Various Artists compilation Triskalyon Promo Pack, which includes both singles from Seul dans l'obsession: "Love Within Isolation (Edit)" and "Love Within Narcosis." Vision Eternel contributed the Abondance de périls b-side "Start from the Beginning: The Accident" to Dedicated Records' Various Artists compilation, Great Messengers: Palms, issued on October 3, 2010. An early version of "Moments of Intimacy" (the song was later re-recorded for For Farewell of Nostalgia) appeared on Canadian record label Coup Sur Coup Records' Various Artists compilation Feedback Through a Magnifying Glass Volume I, released on November 27, 2018. Another early version of "Moments of Absence" (which was also re-recorded for For Farewell of Nostalgia) appeared on Italian record label Dornwald Records' Various Artists compilation Forest of Thorns: A Dornwald Compilation, released on March 25, 2019. British record label Fruits de Mer Records released three songs by the band on its Various Artists compilations: "Killer of Giants" (an Ozzy Osbourne cover) appeared on Fruits de Mer Conducts: Deep Sea Exploration on November 2, 2019; "Moments of Absence" appeared on Fruits de Mer Records Unearths: Sounds from the Underground on November 9, 2020; and "Pièce No. Sept" appeared on Sound Clouds on June 5, 2022.

== Albums ==
=== Compilation albums ===
Title	Album details
Promotional Compilation	Released: June 2007; Label: Mortification
An Anthology of Past Misfortunes	Released: February 14, 2009; Label: Frozen Veins

== Box sets ==
Title	Album details
An Anthology of Past Misfortunes	Released: April 14, 2018; Label: Abridged Pause

== Extended plays ==
Title	EP details
Seul dans l'obsession	Released: February 14, 2007; Label: Mortification
Un automne en solitude	Released: March 14, 2008; Label: Mortification
Abondance de périls	Released: March 9, 2010; Label: Abridged Pause
The Last Great Torch Song	Released: March 14, 2012; Label: Abridged Pause
Echoes from Forgotten Hearts	Released: February 14, 2015; Label: Abridged Pause / Geertruida; Re-issued as a box set on February 14, 2024
For Farewell of Nostalgia	Released: September 14, 2020; Label: Abridged Pause / Geertruida / Somewherecold

== Singles ==
Title	Single details
"Love Within Narcosis"	Released: February 9, 2007; Label: Mortification
"Love Within Isolation"	Released: August 2007; Label: Mortification
"Season in Absence"	Released: April 20, 2008; Label: Mortification
"Thoughts as Naïvety"	Released: February 23, 2010; Label: Abridged Pause
"Pièce No. Sept"	Released: February 14, 2015; Label: Abridged Pause
"Pièce No. Trois"	Released: August 28, 2017; Label: Abridged Pause

== Videos ==
=== Music videos ===
List of music videos, with directors, showing date released along with albums
Title	Date	Director(s)	Album
"Love Within Narcosis"	February 9, 2007	Alexander Julien	Seul dans l'obsession
"Season in Absence"	April 20, 2008	Niels Geybels	Un automne en solitude
"Season in Absence"	March 19, 2010	Alexander Julien	Un automne en solitude
"Pièce No. Trois"	August 28, 2017	Alexander Julien / Jeremy Roux	Echoes from Forgotten Hearts

== Other appearances ==
=== Various Artists compilations ===
Song	Date	Various Artists Album	Label	Original Album
"Love Within Isolation (Edit)" / "Love Within Narcosis"	March 7, 2007	Triskalyon Promo Pack	Mortification	Seul dans l'obsession
"Start from the Beginning: The Accident"	October 3, 2010	Great Messengers: Palms	Dedicated	exclusive
"Thoughts as Solicitation"	December 2, 2012	Glass	Rádio Etiópia	Abondance de périls
"Moments of Intimacy"	November 27, 2018	Feedback Through a Magnifying Glass Volume I	Coup Sur Coup	exclusive
"Moments of Absence"	March 25, 2019	Forest of Thorns: A Dornwald Compilation	Dornwald	exclusive
"Killer of Giants"	November 2, 2019	Fruits de Mer Conducts: Deep Sea Exploration	Fruits de Mer	exclusive
"Sometimes in Longing Narcosis"	November 14, 2019	Netwaves 14.05: Electric Prunes	Netwaves	The Last Great Torch Song
"Moments of Absence"	September 7, 2020	A Geertruida Catalogue Selection	Geertruida	For Farewell of Nostalgia
"Moments of Absence"	November 9, 2020	Fruits de Mer Records Unearths: Sounds from the Underground	Fruits de Mer	For Farewell of Nostalgia
"Moments of Absence"	May 24, 2022	The Shoegaze Collective Radio Show: CCXIII	The Shoegaze Collective	For Farewell of Nostalgia
"Pièce No. Sept"	June 5, 2022	Sound Clouds	Fruits de Mer	Echoes from Forgotten Hearts
