= Vision Eternel =

Canadian-American ambient rock band

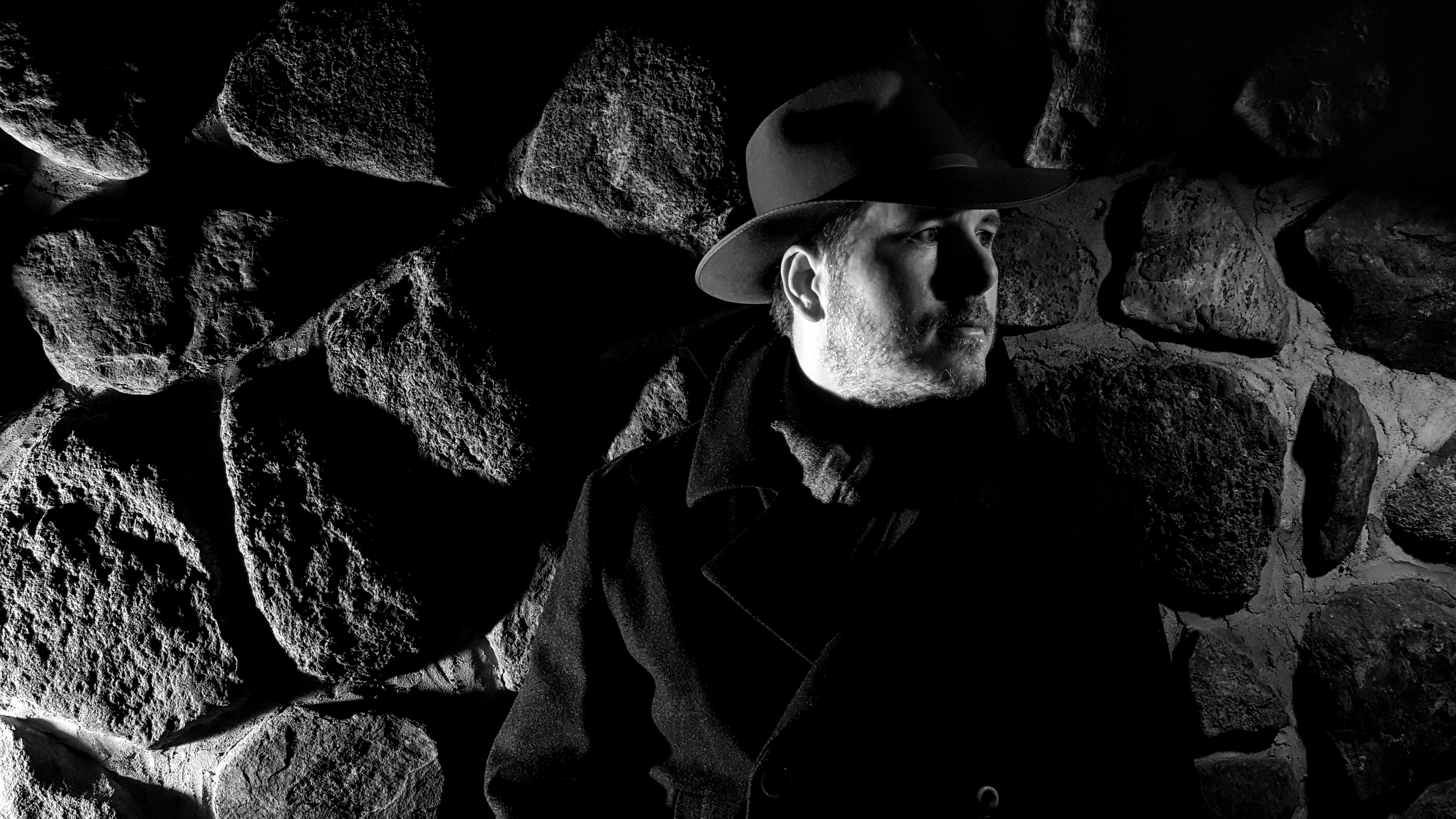
- Vision Eternel photographed at Mortified Studios in Wexford, Quebec, Canada on July 22, 2018.

Background information
- Also known as: Vision Éternel
- Origin: Edison, New Jersey, U.S.
- Genres: Ambient; ethereal; post-rock; shoegaze
- Works: Vision Eternel discography
- Years active: 2007–2025
- Labels: Abridged Pause; Beverina; Casus Belli; Coup Sur Coup; Dedicated; Dornwald; Feather Witch; Frozen Veins; Fruits de Mer; Geertruida; Mortification; Somewherecold; Valse Sinistre; Winterreich
- Past members: Alexander Julien; Philip Altobelli; Nidal Mourad; Adam Kennedy
- Website: www.visioneternel.com

Vision Eternel (originally spelled and stylized as Vision Éternel) was a Canadian-American ambient rock band. Formed by guitarist Alexander Julien in Edison, New Jersey, United States in January 2007, the band eventually relocated to Montreal, Quebec, Canada in July 2007. The musical group's mainly instrumental sound has been described variously by critics as a blend of ambient, shoegaze, post-rock, ethereal, drone, space rock, emo, post-black metal, post-metal, dark ambient, dark wave, experimental rock, minimal, dream pop, progressive rock, modern classical, and new-age.

The band released its debut extended play, Seul dans l'obsession, in 2007, followed by another extended play, Un automne en solitude, in 2008, both via American record label Mortification Records. While still based in New Jersey, the musical group included second guitarist Philip Altobelli, who joined after the release of the band's debut but departed before the recording of the second extended play. Once established in Quebec, the band was expanded with two more guitarists, Nidal Mourad and Adam Kennedy, but they departed before the recording of the band's third output. In 2009, a compilation album of the first two extended plays, An Anthology of Past Misfortunes, was released by Japanese record label Frozen Veins Records.

After signing with Canadian record label Abridged Pause Recordings, Vision Eternel followed up with three more extended plays: Abondance de périls in 2010, The Last Great Torch Song in 2012, and Echoes from Forgotten Hearts (originally composed as the score to a short film) in 2015. In 2018, Abridged Pause Recordings released the box set An Anthology of Past Misfortunes, comprising remastered versions of the band's entire 2007–2015 output, along with a bonus compilation of previously unreleased demos and b-sides. The band's sixth extended play, For Farewell of Nostalgia, was co-released by American record label Somewherecold Records, Dutch record label Geertruida, and Abridged Pause Recordings in 2020. A deluxe edition of Echoes from Forgotten Hearts was issued by Geertruida in 2024, containing the previously unreleased soundtrack version of the recording, a bonus compilation of demos and alternate takes and mixes, and a non-fiction novel detailing the making of the release.

== History ==
=== 2007: Formation, Seul dans l'obsession, and Un automne en solitude ===
Vision Éternel was formed in January 2007 and was initially based in the Briarwood East community of Edison, New Jersey, United States, where guitarist Alexander Julien's parents lived. Julien had played previously in Les Rocker's, The Slopin Fairy 7, The Tom & Alex Project, Scapegoat, and Throne of Mortality, and was then playing in Vision Lunar and Soufferance. Julien stated that the new band came about by accident one night while he was going through an acute depression over an ex-girlfriend (Julien already suffered from chronic depression), and as he was experimenting with a reverb effect while playing electric guitar in his newly-built home studio. The song he composed and recorded that night was later titled "Love Within Beauty." The musician was unsure how the new song would be used since it was so different in style and genre from his other black metal bands at the time, but after composing a second similar song a couple of days later, "Love Within Isolation," the idea of creating a new project to release the music came about.

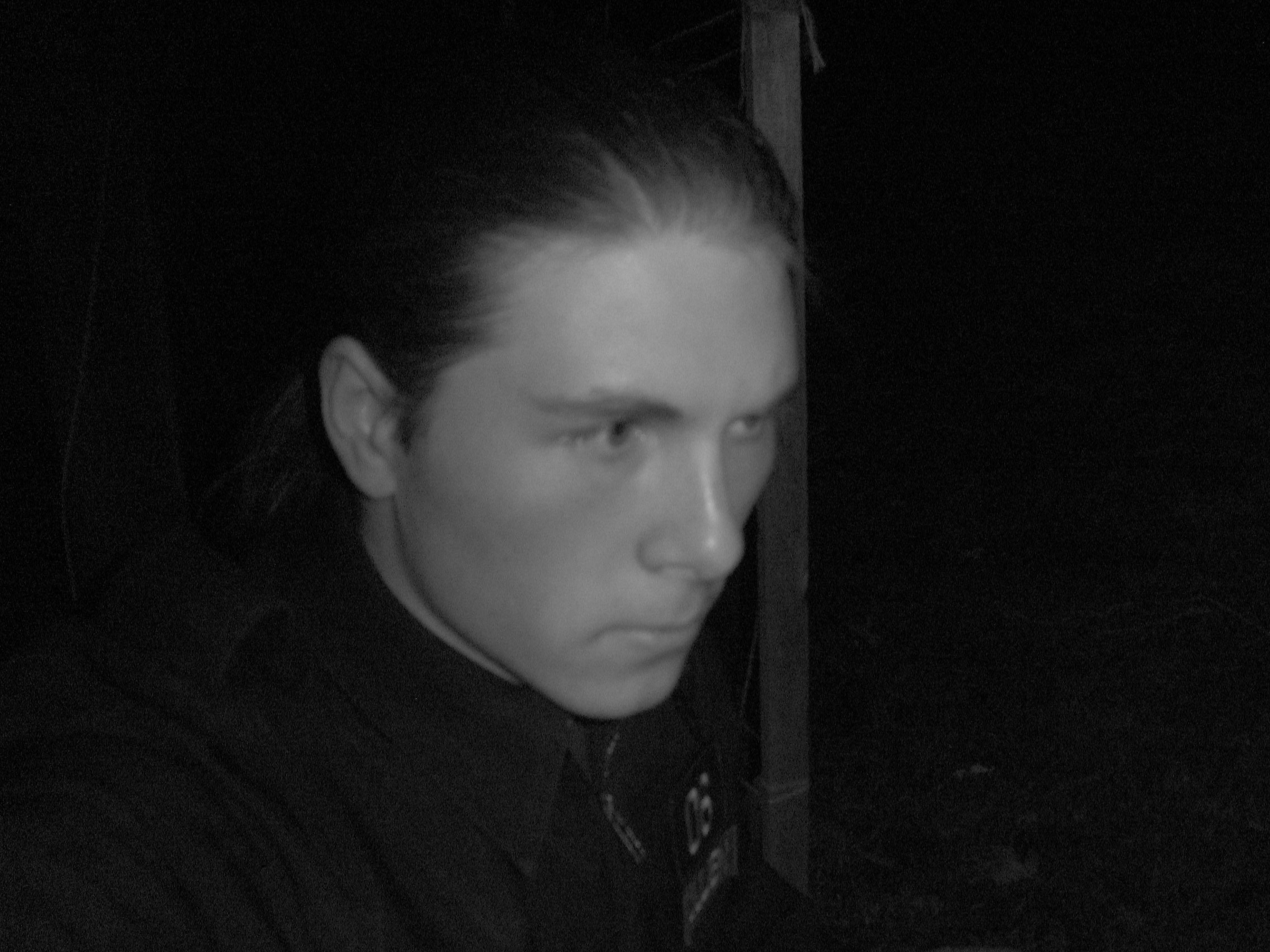
Alexander Julien photographed in Edison, New Jersey on January 4, 2007, around the time Vision Éternel was formed.

The new project was named Vision Éternel because, as Julien explained to Idioteq, "[the] songs were composed while I was depressed and obsessed over an ex-girlfriend; it felt as if I was going to be thinking about her forever – eternally. I chose to deliberately misspell the band's name Vision Eternel (originally Vision Éternel) because it was halfway between Vision Éternelle in French and Vision Eternal in English. Both languages are part of my background and heritage. It resulted in an original band name that would not get lost or confused if searched for online." The band was part of the international music collective Triskalyon, which included such bands as A Forest of Stars, Dark Forest, and Monarque, as well as Julien's other bands, Vision Lunar and Soufferance.

Within a month, Julien had composed and recorded six songs at Mortified Studio, which made up the band's debut concept extended play, Seul dans l'obsession. It was released on Mortification Records, a record label owned by members of Triskalyon, on February 14, 2007, on Valentine's Day, to symbolize the heartbreak, solitude, and depression documented within the music. Julien designed the artwork himself and produced a music video for "Love Within Narcosis," which was released as a lead single via YouTube on February 9, 2007.

To expand the solo studio project into a full band, Julien recruited electric and classical guitarist Philip Altobelli, who was also a member of Triskalyon and had played in the band Darklink. Altobelli only remained with the band briefly before giving up electric guitar to focus on teaching classical guitar. After Altobelli's departure, Julien began work on Vision Éternel's second concept extended play, Un automne en solitude, which was composed and recorded at Mortified Studio between May and July 2007. Julien told ReGen Magazine "I finished recording Un automne en solitude in July 2007, but deliberately held it back from release until 2008, because I did not want Vision Eternel to be one of those bands that saturates its discography with dozens of pointless releases every year. I believe in quality over quantity. The extended play was planned for release on February 14, 2008."

=== 2007–2009: Move to Montreal and An Anthology of Past Misfortunes ===
In June 2007, Julien applied for admission into Recording Arts Canada, a sound engineering college located in Montreal, Quebec, Canada. As per the school's prerequisites, the musician was asked to submit samples of his production work, so Julien compiled a demo CD of songs from Vision Éternel's first two releases, the basis on which he was accepted. He later told Captured Howls "The producer who reviewed my application, and ultimately accepted my enrollment into the school, called me on the phone to tell me that my music impressed him and that it reminded him of Brian Eno's The Shutov Assembly."

Hoping to play concerts once established in Montreal, Julien recruited acoustic guitarist Nidal Mourad and lead electric guitarist Adam Kennedy as new Vision Éternel members; Julien switched to playing rhythm electric guitar in this line-up. The three musicians met at Recording Arts Canada and were new to Montreal; Kennedy came from Ottawa, Ontario, where he had played in several projects, including Orpheus and AK & Lord V, while Mourad, originally from Slave Lake, Alberta, had played in the metalcore band Natesment. The trio wrote new arrangements of songs from the still unreleased Un automne en solitude, changing the band's sound from ambient to indie rock and post-rock. In a retrospective interview for Terra Relicta, Julien said, "As soon as I heard how amazing, and different, these songs had become with the band, I strongly considered shelving the release or keeping it as a demo. Vision Eternel was evolving into something else and I was open to the idea of changing the band's name." However, Mourad quit the band to break out as a solo folk singer-songwriter, and he eventually became a disc jockey performing under the name Ziko Ghost. Julien and Kennedy continued playing together briefly, but ultimately, Vision Éternel reverted to being Julien's solo project. Kennedy went on to play in the bands Gospel of Wisdom, 1993, Acid Cross, Beyond the Dune Sea, Owl Eyes Project, and Wake the Wolf.

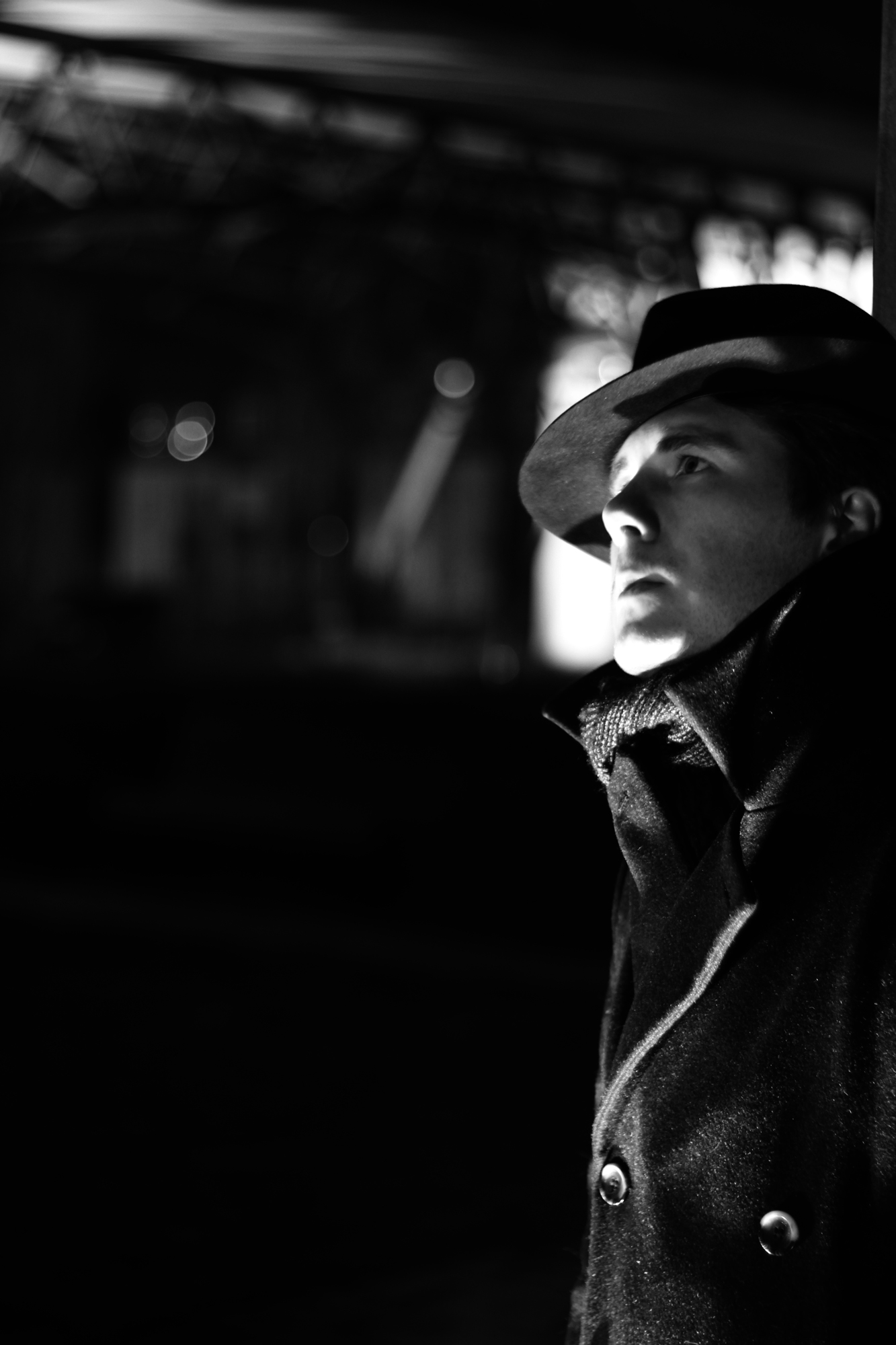
Vision Éternel photographed at Dalhousie Station in Montreal, Quebec on December 3, 2011.

Un automne en solitude was again released through Mortification Records, but it was delayed from a planned February 14 date to a month later, on March 14, 2008, due to artwork issues. Julien later expressed remorse that the extended play was not promoted upon release, in part due to the record company winding down. Nevertheless, two music videos were produced for the single "Season in Absence." The first was produced by Belgian artist and designer Niels Geybels through his company Depraved Designs and released on April 20, 2008. The second was produced by Julien two years later and released on March 19, 2010.

The band caught the attention of Japanese record label Frozen Veins Records, which issued the compilation album An Anthology of Past Misfortunes, comprising the first two extended plays and three unreleased b-sides plus a poster, on February 14, 2009. Australian record company Winterreich Records was scheduled to reissue both extended plays with new artwork on compact cassettes in 2009, but it never materialized. Romanian record label Valse Sinistre Productions then planned to re-issue the band's discography on compact cassette in a box set, but this also fell through.

Between 2008 and 2010, the band announced a series of split 7-inch singles scheduled for release through Julien's newly formed record company, Abridged Pause Recordings, which were all canceled. The first of these splits was to be with Californian post-rock band Ethereal Beauty, and was in development since mid-2008. The release stalled for two years as Julien waited for the Californian band to record its music. In 2010, Ethereal Beauty was renamed to Bonfires for Nobody, but the band still did not record the necessary songs for the split, and by October 2010, it was canceled. Another split announced by Vision Éternel in 2009 for Abridged Pause Recordings was to be with Washingtonian post-rock band Tasharg, but the latter band also changed name (to Lena Lou) and never recorded the material. The final split was announced in 2010 and was to be with Swiss ambient musician Marc Doudin but for release on Romanian record label Asiluum Arts. Julien later revealed that most of the material recorded for the splits over the years was repurposed into Vision Éternel's fourth extended play, The Last Great Torch Song, in 2012.

=== 2009–2012: Abondance de périls and The Last Great Torch Song ===
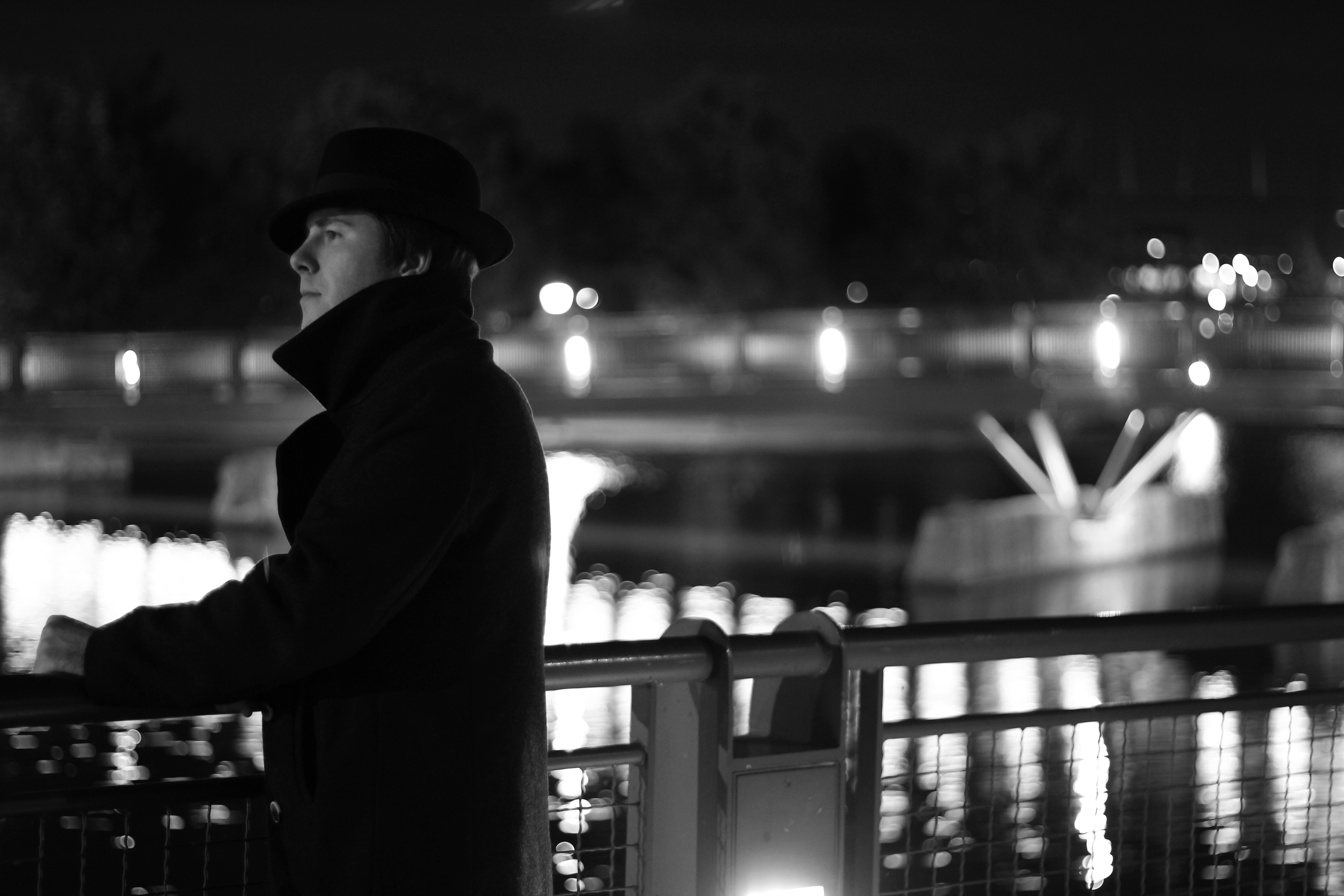
Vision Éternel photographed at the Bonsecours Market Bassin at the Old Port of Montreal, Quebec on September 21, 2010.

Julien had begun working on Vision Éternel's third concept extended play, Abondance de périls, in October 2007, but it took two and a half years before the musician composed and recorded enough material. The songs were eventually recorded between May 2009 and January 2010, at Mortified Studios (then located in Julien's apartment in Montreal). Abondance de périls was originally scheduled for release on February 14, 2010, but it was delayed because of the mastering sessions with ex-bandmate Adam Kennedy. It was eventually released via Abridged Pause Recordings on March 9, 2010, a date the musician later regretted as it was the only time a Vision Éternel release did not come out on the 14th day of a month. The delay resulted in Julien introducing the Valentine's Day Exclusive Heartbreak Treat, an annual event on Valentine's Day during which he offers an unreleased song from the band's archives in lieu of a new release. The artwork for Abondance de périls was designed from a photograph taken by Julien's roommate, French photographer Marina Polak.

Also in 2010, Vision Éternel contributed an exclusive song to Canadian netlabel, who was based in Chicago Dedicated Records', Great Messengers: Palms, a concept record. The band submitted a b-side from Abondance de périls titled "Thoughts as Consolation," but the record company's owner, retitled it to "Start from the Beginning: The Accident." to fix said concept. Great Messengers: Palms was released on October 3, 2010.

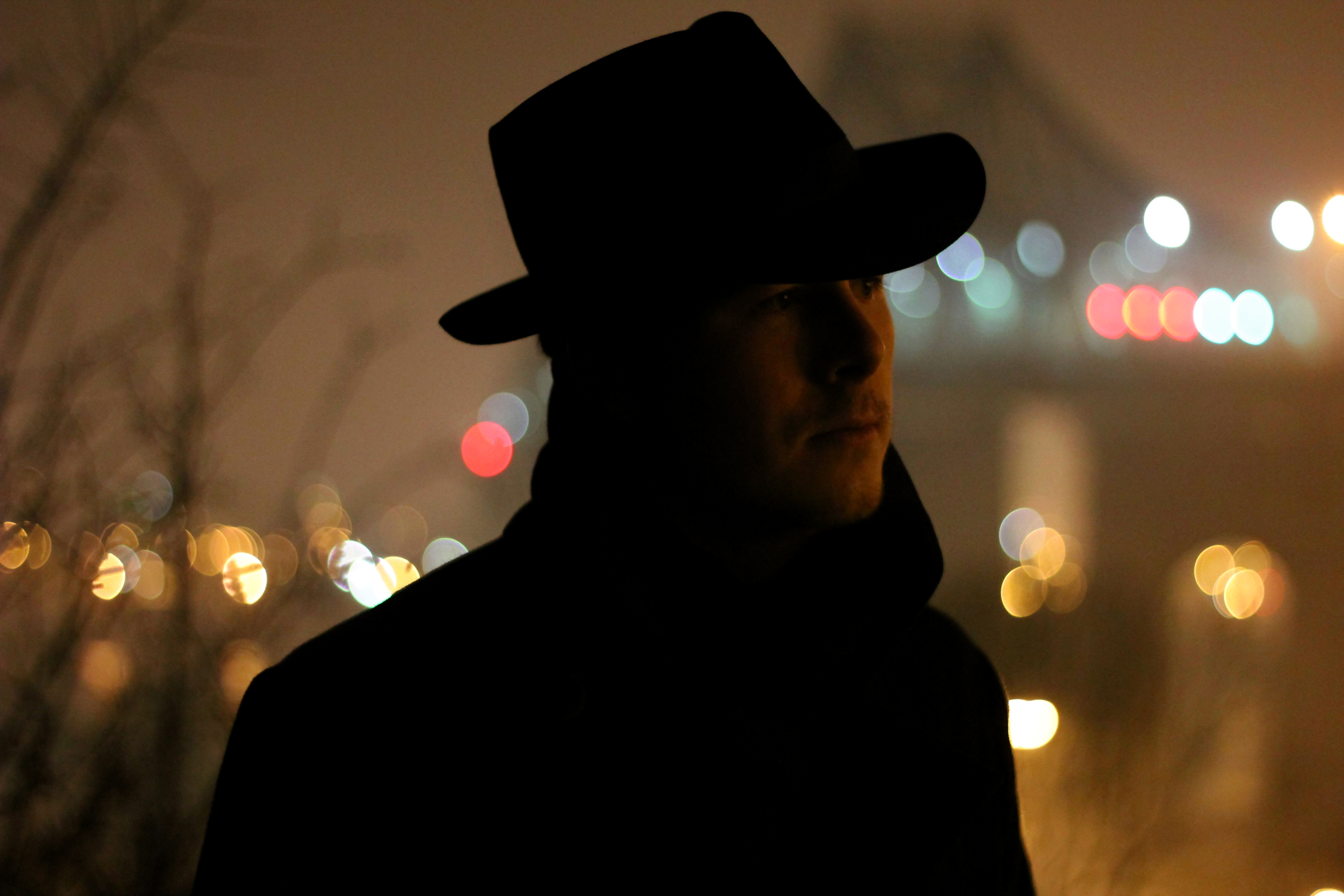
Vision Éternel photographed near the Montreal Harbor Bridge on Saint Helen's Island, Quebec on March 16, 2012.

Vision Éternel's fourth concept extended play, The Last Great Torch Song, was made up of songs left over from Abondance de périls' recording session, others recorded for the planned split releases that were canceled, and also from new material recorded throughout 2010 and 2011. It features guest musicians on nearly every song, including Eiman Iranenejad (formerly of Mutiny Within) and Garry Brents (who later played in Memorrhage) on "Sometimes in Longing Narcosis," Alexander Fawcett on "Sometimes in Anticipating Moments," and Howard Change on "Sometimes in Absolute Togetherness." Brents also mastered the release because Kennedy (Julien's first choice) was unavailable.

For the artwork of The Last Great Torch Song, Julien had planned to pay tribute to Frank Sinatra's In the Wee Small Hours album cover, using photographs taken by his best friend Jeremy Roux, but this did not materialize (it was later achieved with the artwork of For Farewell of Nostalgia). Instead, Polak's photography was again used. Like all of the band's previous outputs, Julien had hoped to release the extended play through Abridged Pause Recordings on February 14, 2012, but it was delayed until March 14, 2012 because of late guest contributions, the mastering sessions, and artwork changes. A music video was planned for "Sometimes in Longing Narcosis," but the footage that was shot with Roux was lost to a hard drive crash a week after the extended play's release. While working on The Last Great Torch Song and after its release, Julien hinted that it may be Vision Éternel's swan song.

=== 2013–2018: Echoes from Forgotten Hearts and tenth anniversary ===
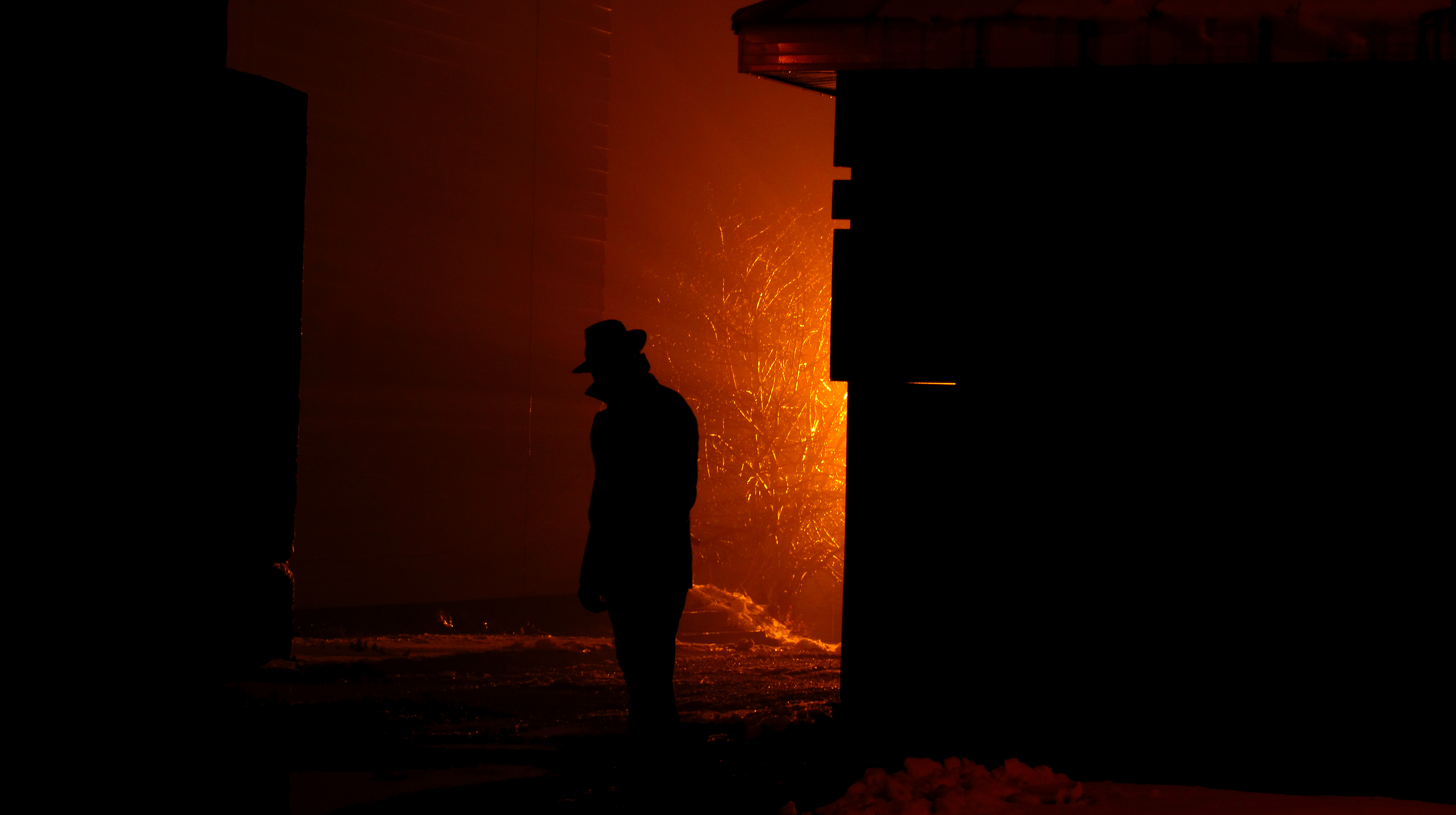
Vision Éternel photographed in Wexford, Quebec on December 23, 2015.

In August 2014, Julien was commissioned by former Dedicated Records owner, to compose the score to a short film. Julien composed, arranged, and recorded the music between August and October 2014, but afterward found out that he had cancelled the filming and didn't have the funds. Unwilling to let his music go to waste, Julien returned to Mortified Studios (since relocated to Saint-Hippolyte-of-Kilkenny, Quebec) from November to December 2014, to re-record, re-mix, and re-conceptualize the material into Vision Étermel's fifth concept extended play, Echoes from Forgotten Hearts. Kennedy was hired to master the extended play but the band opted to instead release it with Julien's final mix, without mastering. The artwork for Echoes from Forgotten Hearts was designed by Roux as a tribute to the Moon soundtrack and film poster.

It took the band nearly a decade to successfully release Echoes from Forgotten Hearts in a physical format. American record label Broken Limbs Recordings initially offered to release it on compact cassette but canceled the release within a month. It was then picked up for another compact cassette release by Bulgarian company Abandonment, but it was left in limbo for six months before the band determined it had been canceled. The band was then signed by American start-up record label Feather Witch (since then renamed to Fiadh Productions), which also offered to issue a compact cassette edition, but the band withdrew from the firm's roster after Julien received a drunken telephone call from the company's owner in the middle of the night. Julien finally opted to release Echoes from Forgotten Hearts digitally through Abridged Pause Recordings on February 14, 2015.

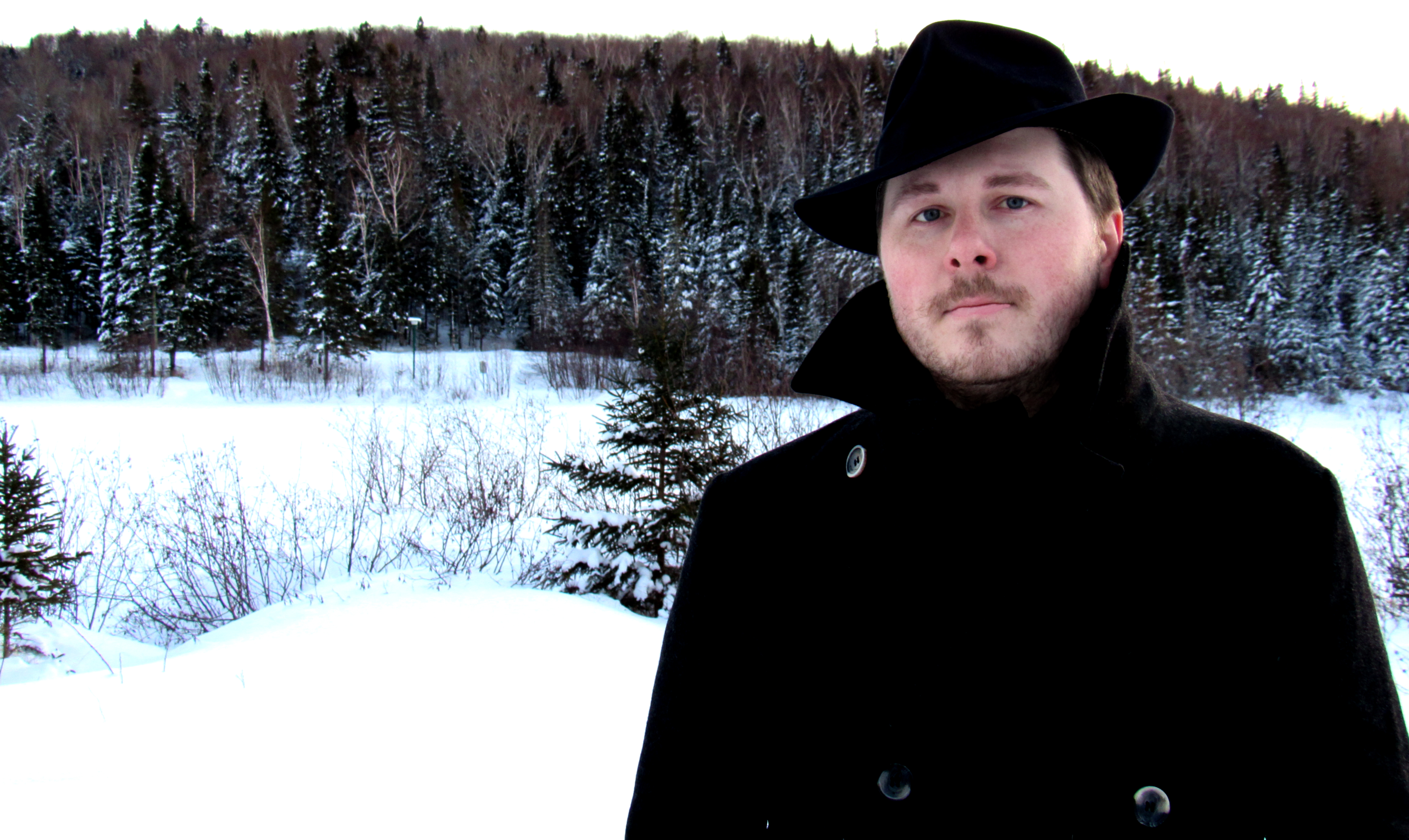
Vision Éternel photographed in Notre-Dame-de-la-Merci, Quebec on January 8, 2017, for the band's tenth anniversary.

In 2017, Vision Éternel celebrated its tenth anniversary with the introduction of a new logo by Belgian calligraphist Christophe Szpajdel. New merchandise was sold featuring both Szpajdel's new logo and Roux's original logo. In 2020, the band's logo was included in Szpajdel's art book Archaic Modernism: The Art of Christophe Szpajdel, published via Heavy Music Artwork. A music video was also produced for "Pièce No. Trois," using the footage which had been lost in 2012 and since recovered. The music video was edited by Vasily Atutov and released on August 28, 2017. Another music video for "Sometimes in Longing Narcosis" was announced in February 2018, but was never completed.

The highlight of the band's tenth anniversary was to be the box set An Anthology of Past Misfortunes, which was scheduled for release via Abridged Pause Recordings on February 14, 2017, but wound up being delayed by fourteen months, until April 14, 2018. Julien told ReGen Magazine that the lengthy delay was caused by "numerous mishaps at the pressing and printing plants." He elaborated further with Transcending the Mundane, stating, "Every single item in the boxed set had to be re-printed or re-pressed because the company with which I had placed my order, Analogue Media Technologies, ruined them. It was a nightmare. As a result, I was forced to reduce the number of boxed sets I had planned to make and ended up putting together a mostly homemade package." The box contained a complete discography of the band's releases up to that point (the first five extended plays), stickers, postcards, business card flyers, and a compact cassette compilation album titled Lost Misfortunes: A Selection of Demos and Rarities (Part One), comprising 19 demos and b-sides. In October 2018, Vision Éternel officially dropped the accute accent from the spelling of its name and became Vision Eternel.

=== 2018–2025: For Farewell of Nostalgia, Echoes from Forgotten Hearts reissue, and Julien's death ===
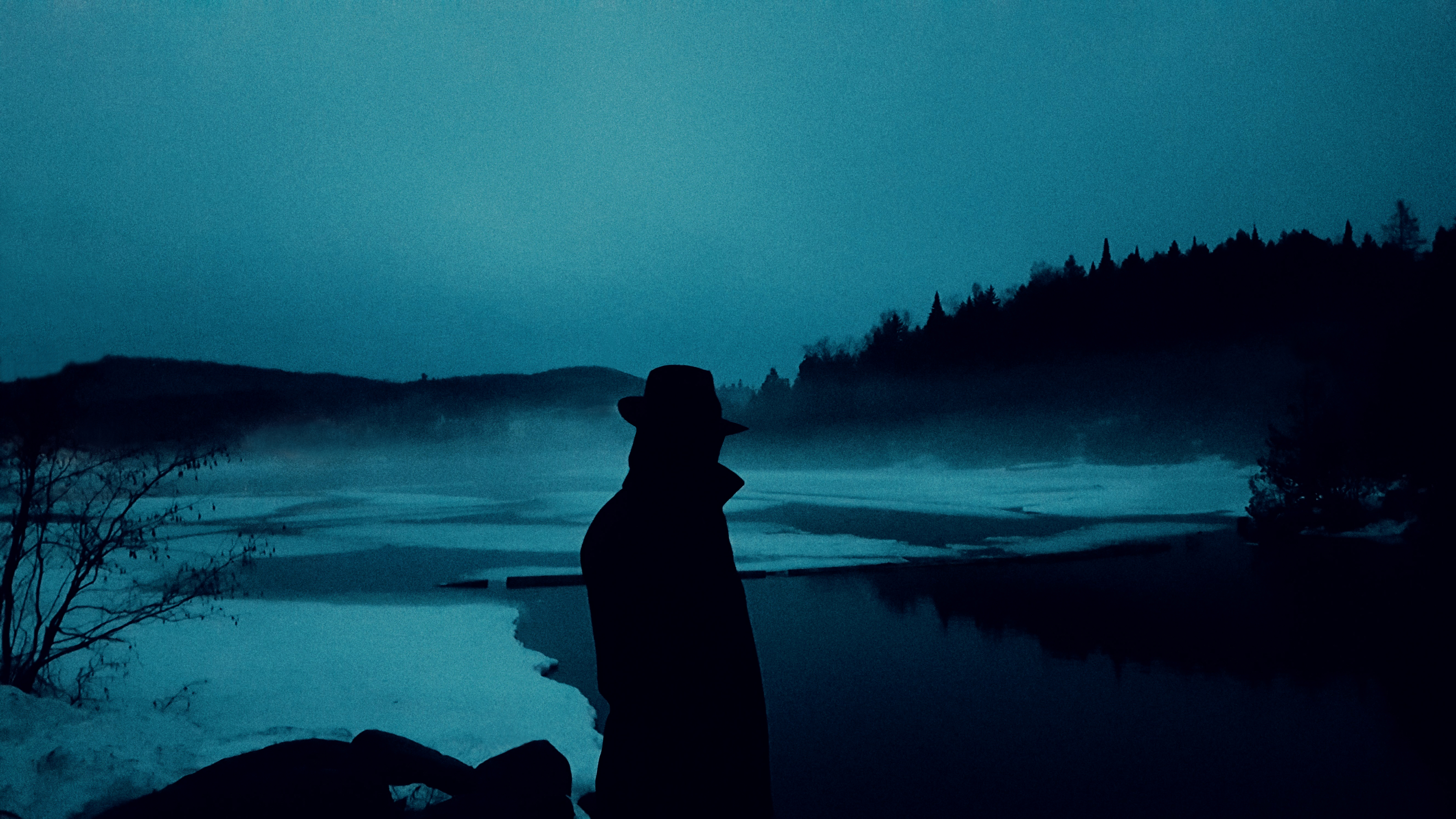
Vision Éternel photographed in Wexford, Quebec on April 10, 2017.

Vision Eternel started composing and demoing songs for its sixth concept extended play, For Farewell of Nostalgia, in 2017, but had to put it on hold during the band's tenth anniversary to focus on the box set and other merchandise. For Farewell of Nostalgia was eventually recorded over seven months, between April and October 2018, at Mortified Studios (then relocated to Wexford, Quebec), but Julien was unhappy with the material and shelved the release for a year. Some of the songs recorded during the 2018 session were released on Various Artists compilation albums, including Canadian record label Coup Sur Coup Records' Feedback Through A Magnifying Glass Volume I (using "Moments of Intimacy," released on November 27, 2018), Italian record label Dornwald Records' Forest of Thorns: A Dornwald Compilation (using "Moments of Absence," released on March 25, 2019), and British record label Fruits de Mer Records' Fruits de Mer Conducts: Deep Sea Exploration (using an Ozzy Osbourne cover of "Killer of Giants," released on November 2, 2019).

Julien fully re-recorded For Farewell of Nostalgia at Mortified Studios between October and November 2019. Initially scheduled for release on February 14, 2020, to tie in with the band's yearly Valentine's Day commemoration, the extended play was pushed back by seven months due to delays with artwork and complications with record labels and pressing plants during the early outbreak of the COVID-19 pandemic. It was released on September 14, 2020, via Abridged Pause Recordings, in collaboration with Dutch record label Geertruida and American record company Somewherecold Records; a short story was included with the physical editions. For Farewell of Nostalgia was mastered by Carl Saff and its artwork was painted by Michael Koelsch and pays tribute to Frank Sinatra's album In the Wee Small Hours. The double compact cassette release from Geertruida also includes a second tape, Lost Misfortunes: A Selection of Demos and Rarities (Part Two), comprising twelve b-sides and pre-production demos. Fruits de Mer Records also included the song "Moments of Absence" on its Various Artists compilation album Fruits de Mer Records Unearths: Sounds from the Underground, released on November 9, 2020.

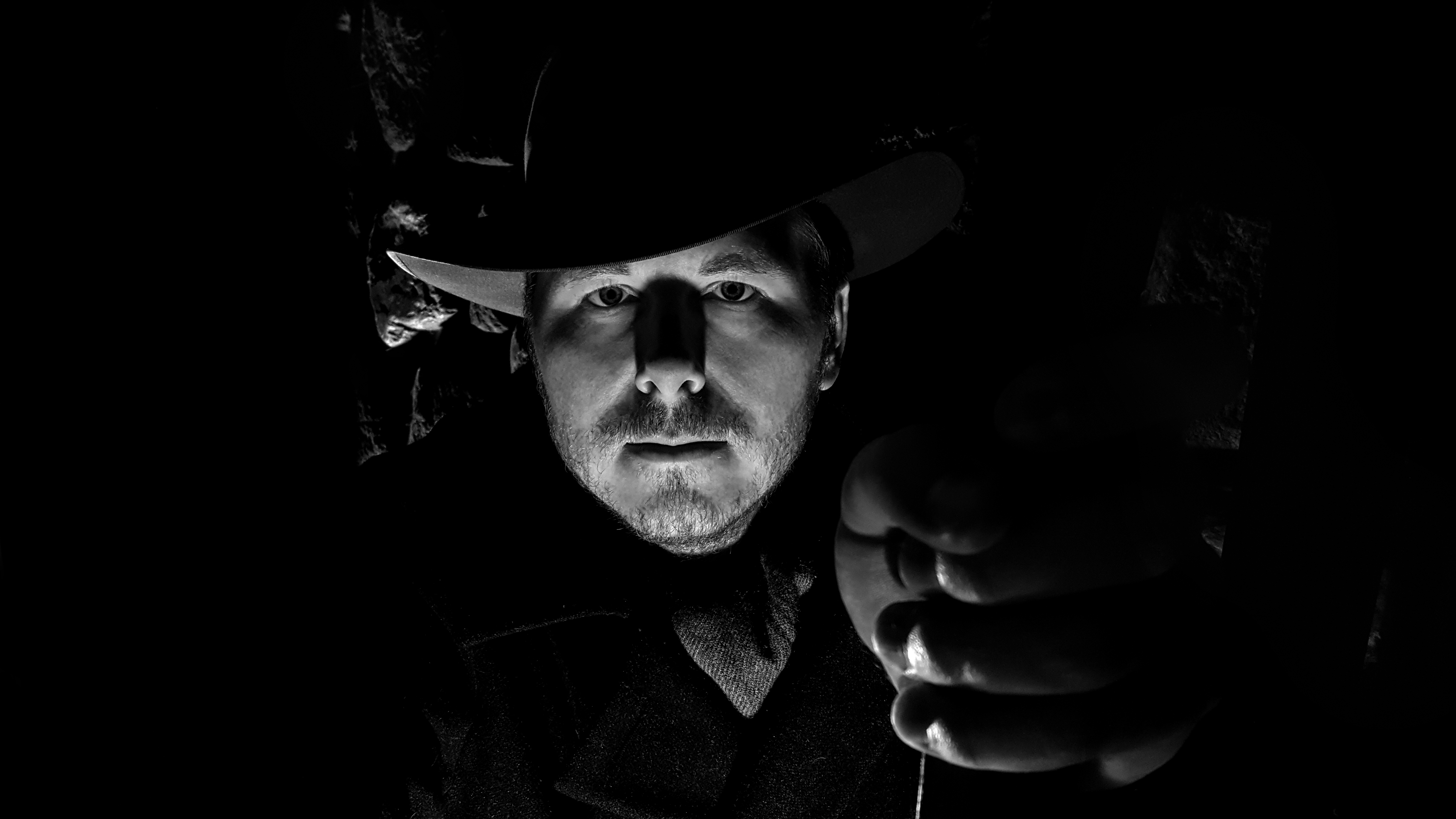
Vision Eternel photographed at Mortified Studios in Wexford, Quebec on July 22, 2018.

After the release of For Farewell of Nostalgia, the band spent the next four years organizing a deluxe edition reissue of Echoes from Forgotten Hearts. It was first scheduled for release in 2021 via Somewherecold Records, but the band withdrew itself from the company's roster after the owner, Jason T. Lamoreaux, insisted Vision Eternel take part in a Christian-themed Various Artists compilation album. The re-issue was next picked up by Russian record label Frozen Light, but the band was unable to get a solid commitment from the company and was forced to look elsewhere. Vision Eternel was then signed to a co-production deal between Latvian/Austrian record label Beverina Productions and Russian company Casus Belli Musica, which scheduled the release of Echoes from Forgotten Hearts in early 2022, but due to delays with the artwork, and the outbreak of a war in Europe, the release wound up canceled. The band next secured a releasing deal with Bulgarian company Mahorka, but after months of negotiations over packaging, the release was canceled.

The deluxe edition of Echoes from Forgotten Hearts was finally issued by Geertruida on February 14, 2024. Fully remastered by Carl Saff, it was packaged in a double compact cassette thermoform box set and included an 80-page novella titled The Making of Echoes from Forgotten Hearts – A Narrative of Vision Eternel's Soundtrack, in which Julien details the making of the release, the difficulty he had getting it released, and the reasons for its delay, along with 70 images from the band archives. It contains the seven-song version (released as the extended play in 2015), the unreleased six-song soundtrack version, and ten demos, unused takes, and alternate mixes on a bonus tape titled Lost Misfortunes: A Selection of Demos and Rarities (Part Three). The cover artwork of the deluxe edition was painted by Michael Koelsch and is a tribute to the theatrical poster of Charlie Chaplin's 1931 film City Lights.

On June 3, 2025, it was announced that Julien died at the age of 37 on May 14. No cause of death was given. His death marked the automatic dissolution of Vision Eternel.

== Style and influences ==
Vision Eternel's mainly instrumental sound has been described variously by critics as a blend of ambient, shoegaze, post-rock, ethereal, drone, space rock, emo, post-black metal, post-metal, dark ambient, dark wave, experimental rock, minimal, dream pop, progressive rock, modern classical, gothic rock, and new-age.

"I came up with the term melogaze in 2010, after three-and-a-half years of struggling to find a matching genre for Vision Eternel. It was not so much that I did not want my music to be labeled; it was more the fact that others refused to accept Vision Eternel in any of the styles that had been proposed by friends and fans."

— Alexander Julien, Terra Relicta

Julien remained unconvinced about Vision Eternel's place within those genres, and he eventually coined a new term, melogaze, to describe his music in September 2010. He explained to Idioteq in 2020, "People tend to label my music 'guitar ambient'; I think that is a fair description but I do not listen to that style of music. My influences really do come from genres that are unrelated to the ambient, shoegaze, or post-rock scenes; perhaps that is why it has been so difficult for Vision Eternel to be categorized, not only by me, but also by fans and record labels. It is ambient, but it is also rock-based."

He continued, "A great deal of genres and labels have been attached to Vision Eternel over the years, but they apparently did not please everyone. Whenever someone claimed that Vision Eternel was an ambient band, someone else argued that it had no keyboards. When someone thought that it was post-rock, someone else rebutted that it had no drums. When someone was pushing the terms shoegaze, dream pop, or dream rock, fans were quick to point out that it lacked vocals. Others hoped to label it ethereal or darkwave, but that community was adamant about having electronic instruments. The space rock fans were slightly more open-minded but never fully accepted it because it was not psychedelic enough. The term drone was also briefly used by a couple of journalists, but that too was quickly shut down because the songs are too structured. The dark ambient community wanted nothing of it because it was too hopeful in nature. And finally, the emo revivalist community was skeptical because real emo was something that existed in the 1990s. Vision Eternel certainly has a little bit of each of those genres, yet it is not any one of them. But I grew tired of trying to impose Vision Eternel on genres or scenes, so in 2010, I coined the term melogaze."

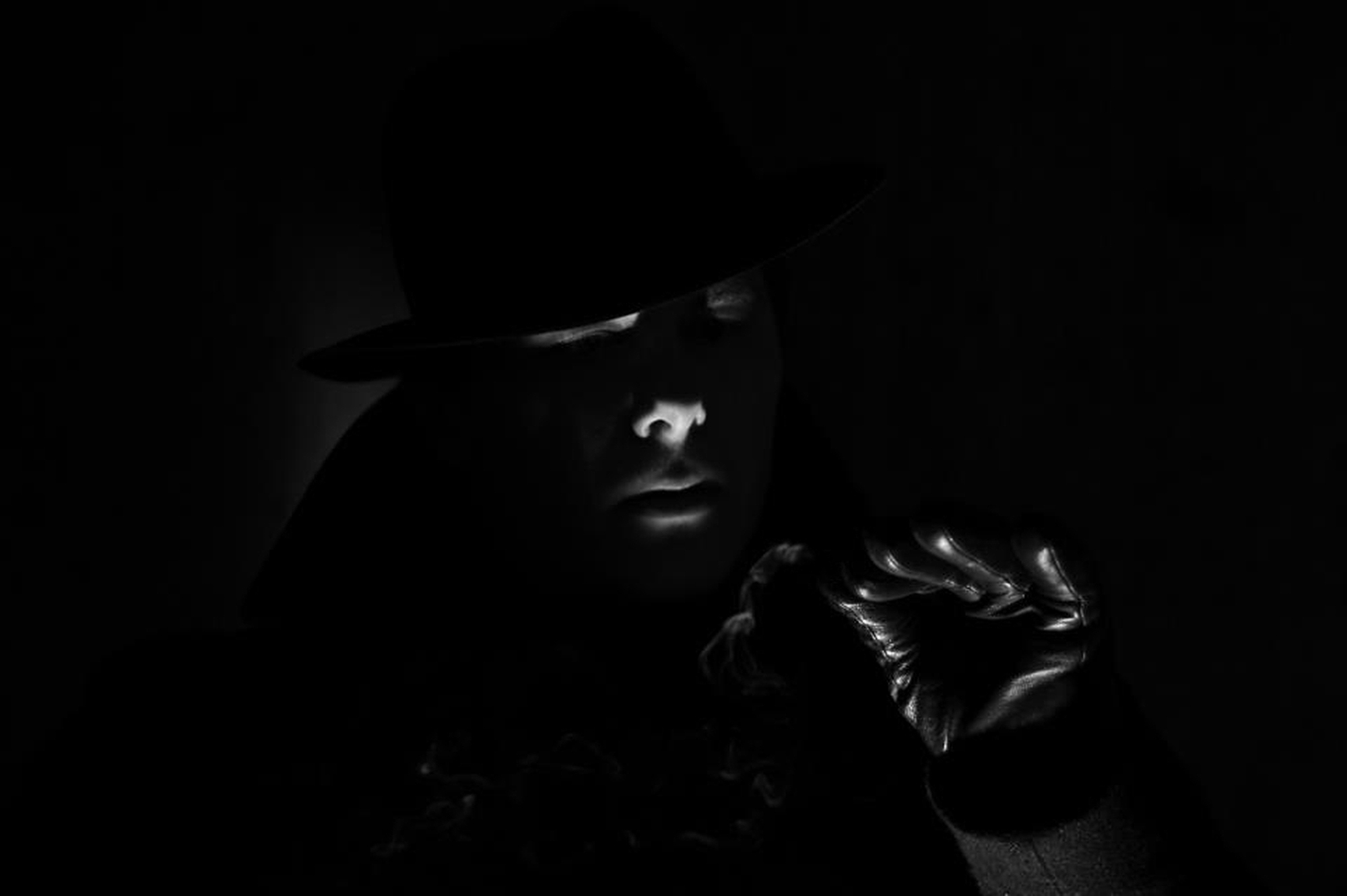
Vision Éternel photographed at Dalhousie Station in Montreal, Quebec on December 3, 2011. The picture showcases the band's film noir influences.

During an interview with Captured Howls, Julien said it was difficult for him to pinpoint Vision Eternel's influences, explaining, "I do not personally listen to the genres of music that are generally affixed to the band. My songwriting, recording, and mixing influences are almost completely unrelated to those genres, or even to music at times. A lot of the musical influences for Vision Eternel come from my subconscious; songs that I really have to think back on as meaningful." He also told The Spill Magazine, "Vision Eternel is very much emotion-based, not genre or style-based." He further related that he makes it a point not to listen to music during Vision Eternel's writing and recording sessions so that his emotions and subconscious influences can remain natural.

Julien shared with The Noise Beneath the Snow that "Vision Eternel's compositions have always been more influenced by films rather than music." He elaborated to Idioteq, "I would say that watching movies has a much more immediate effect on my compositions and recordings than listening to music. Films create an immediate mood and tone, and I often begin composing music after watching one. I am highly influenced by melodramatic films." He confessed to It's Psychedelic Baby! Magazine that watching films is, for him, a form of escapism, which makes him very sentimental and inspires his creativity. The musician often singled out Alfred Hitchcock as his favorite director and Vertigo as his favorite film, both of which he noted as instrumental in Vision Eternel's development of themes and concepts for extended plays. Other film directors mentioned as influential to the band include Douglas Sirk, Fritz Lang, Billy Wilder, Orson Welles, Charlie Chaplin, F. W. Murnau, John Frankenheimer, Jean-Pierre Melville, Henri-Georges Clouzot, Jacques Deray, Henri Verneuil, Woody Allen, Alan J. Pakula, and Cameron Crowe.

In numerous interviews, Julien singled out Faith No More as his favorite band and asserted that their influence on Vision Eternel's music, although different in genre and style, was nevertheless prominent. He further highlighted bass guitarist Billy Gould as highly influential in the way that he plays electric bass guitar. Other bands and artists mentioned as significant include The Smashing Pumpkins, Limp Bizkit, Swans, Frank Sinatra, Elton John, Clint Mansell, Bernard Herrmann, CSTVT, As Friends Rust, Deadsy, Pink Floyd, Harmonium, Bathory, Eleventh He Reaches London, Chamberlain, Mother Love Bone, King Diamond, Ozzy Osbourne, Burzum, Dissection, Immortal, Eliminator, Brainscan, Black Sand and Starless Nights, and Montgomery 21, which Julien told Captured Howls "are probably the artists that are mainly responsible for the way that Vision Eternel sounds."

== Members ==
Main founder

- Alexander Julien – electric guitar, acoustic guitar, electric bass guitar, eBow (2007–2025, his death)

Former members

- Philip Altobelli – electric guitar, classical guitar (2007)
- Nidal Mourad – acoustic guitar (2008)
- Adam Kennedy – electric guitar (2008)

== Discography ==
EPs

- Seul dans l'obsession (Mortification Records, 2007)
- Un automne en solitude (Mortification Records, 2008)
- Abondance de périls (Abridged Pause Recordings, 2010)
- The Last Great Torch Song (Abridged Pause Recordings, 2012)
- Echoes from Forgotten Hearts (Abridged Pause Recordings, 2015 / Geertruida, 2024)
- For Farewell of Nostalgia (Somewherecold Records / Geertruida / Abridged Pause Recordings, 2020)

== See also ==
- List of ambient music artists
- List of bands from Canada
- List of dark ambient artists
- List of dream pop artists
- List of drone artists
- List of instrumental bands
- List of Montreal music groups
- List of new-age music artists
- List of post-rock bands
- List of shoegaze bands
