= Echoes from Forgotten Hearts =

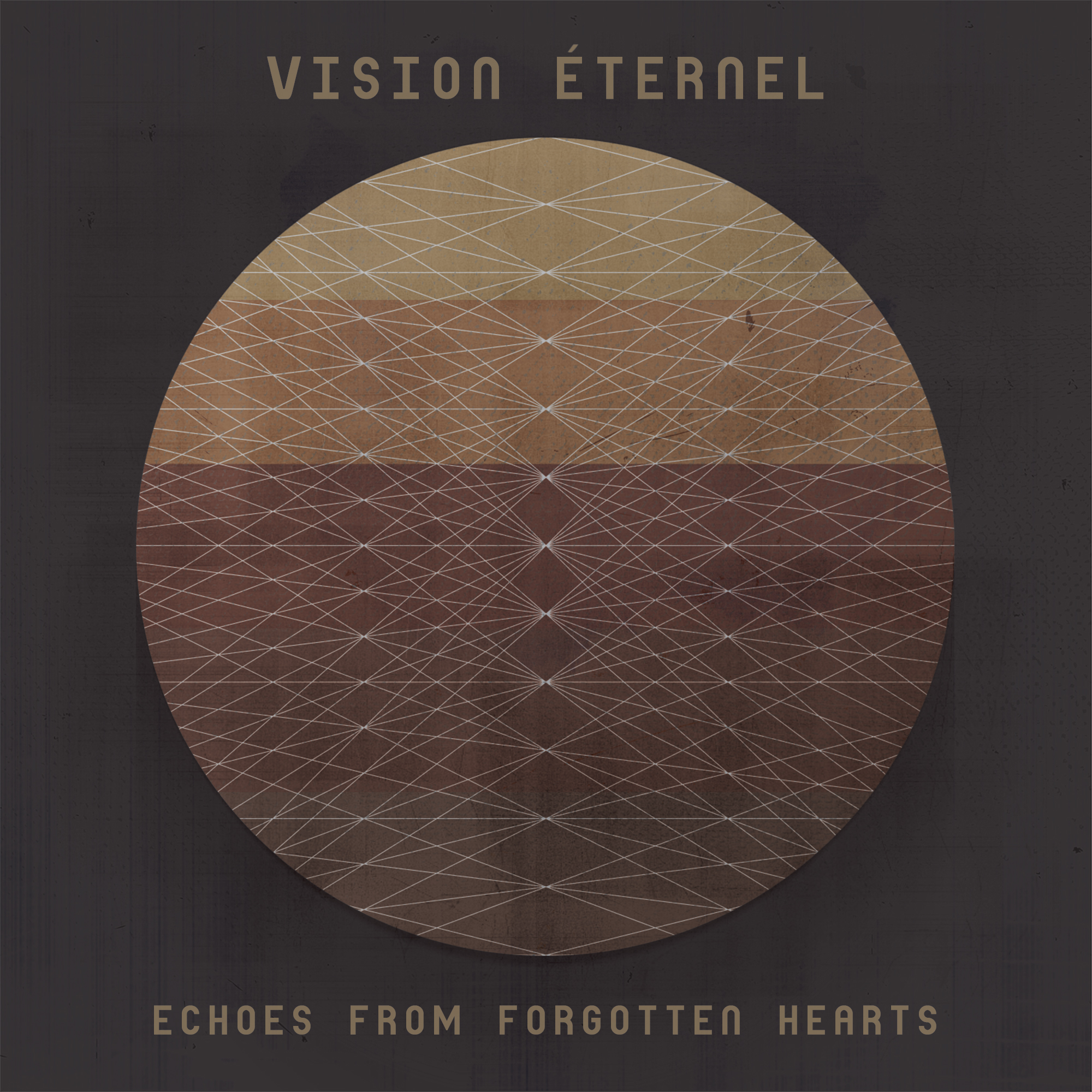
- Echoes from Forgotten Hearts original cover artwork.

EP by Vision Eternel
- Released: February 14, 2015
- Recorded: October 4, 2014 – December 18, 2014
- Studio: Mortified Studios, Saint-Hippolyte-of-Kilkenny, Quebec, Canada
- Genre: Ambient; post-rock; shoegaze; drone
- Length: 14:22
- Label: Abridged Pause; Geertruida
- Producer: Alexander Julien

Vision Eternel chronology
The Last Great Torch Song (2012)	Echoes from Forgotten Hearts (2015)	For Farewell of Nostalgia (2020)

Deluxe Edition cover
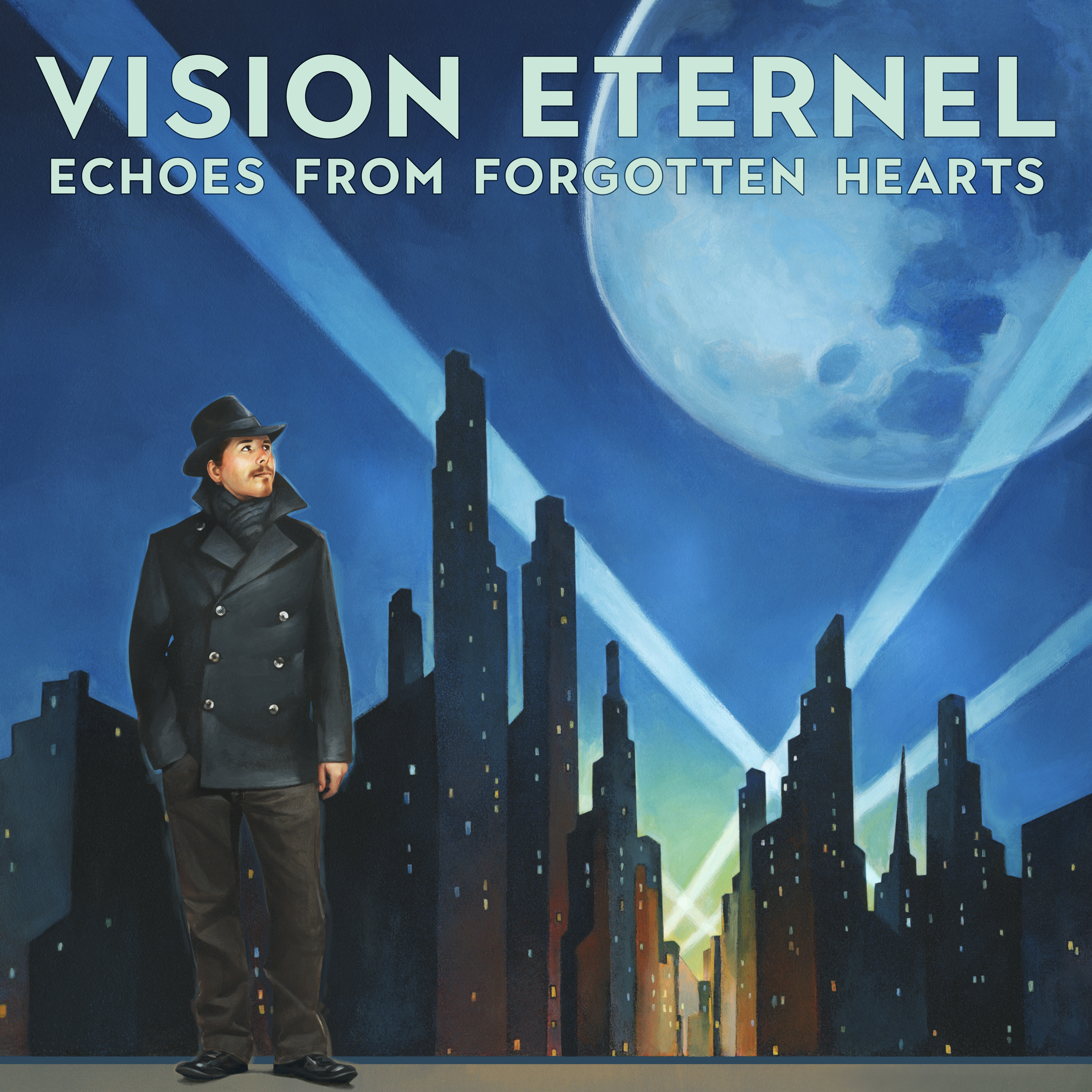
- Echoes from Forgotten Hearts Deluxe Edition cover artwork.

Echoes from Forgotten Hearts is the fifth extended play by Canadian-American ambient rock band Vision Eternel. The release was initially composed, arranged, and recorded by principal band member Alexander Julien between August–October 2014, as the score to a short film. When the writer-director-producer of the movie abandoned the project, Julien returned to Mortified Studios in Saint-Hippolyte-of-Kilkenny, Quebec, spending November–December 2014, to re-record, re-mix, and re-conceptualize the material into an extended play. The music is instrumental and blends elements from several genres and styles, including ambient, post-rock, shoegaze, drone, ethereal, post-black metal, experimental rock, and minimal.

The band tried unsuccessfully for years to secure a record deal to release Echoes from Forgotten Hearts on physical format. It was first released digitally by Abridged Pause Recordings on February 14, 2015, to tie in with the band's yearly Valentine's Day commemoration, but was only available via Bandcamp. On February 14, 2017, in celebration of Vision Eternel's tenth anniversary, Abridged Pause Recordings re-issued the extended play digitally to major music streaming and download services, and a music video was produced for the song "Pièce No. Trois," which premiered on August 28, 2017. A limited edition compact disc was eventually offered as part of Vision Eternel's An Anthology of Past Misfortunes box set, also released via Abridged Pause Recordings, on April 14, 2018.

On February 14, 2024, Geertruida issued an expanded, remastered, tenth anniversary deluxe edition with new artwork, as a double compact cassette box set and digitally. The box set edition includes an 80-page novella titled The Making of Echoes from Forgotten Hearts - A Narrative of Vision Eternel's Soundtrack, in which Julien details the making of the release, the difficulty he had getting it released, and the reasons for its delay, along with 70 images from the band archives. The cover artwork of the deluxe edition is a tribute to the theatrical poster of Charlie Chaplin's 1931 film City Lights.

== Background ==
=== Early attempts (January – February 2013) ===
On March 14, 2012, Vision Eternel released its fourth extended play, The Last Great Torch Song. Exceptionally for the band at the time, it featured guest musicians on nearly every song, including Eiman Iranenejad (formerly of Mutiny Within) and Garry Brents (later of Memorrhage). Founding band member Alexander Julien speculated during and after its release that it may be the band's swan song.

Julien first announced that work had begun on the band's fifth extended play in January 2013 and that he wished to again feature guest musicians on nearly all of the seven planned songs for the release. Two songs were reported as complete, one featuring Monica Renteria (of Éphémère) and another with Valerio Orlandini (of Symbiosis and Citadel Swamp). A third was underway and the band hoped to finish the extended play by the end of the year for a February 2014 release through Julien's independent record label, Abridged Pause Recordings.

When asked about the status of the release during an interview in August 2013, Julien said he had recorded material in February 2013, but that it may not be used on the planned extended play. The material recorded in 2013 was never released.

=== New composition and proposed film score (August – September 2014) ===
In mid-August 2014, Julien started composing a new song that, in its completed form, he envisioned as lasting seven to ten minutes, but was, at the time, unattached to a specific band. It incorporated elements from several of his bands, including Vision Eternel and Soufferance (a black ambient project), which was a tendency for the musician dating back to 2007, with the recording of Soufferance's song "A Memory of Past Emotions," and continued through The Last Great Torch Song.

In late August 2014, former Dedicated Records owner Bradley James Palko asked Julien to compose the score for one of three short films he planned to write, direct, and produce in Iceland. The other two movies were to be scored by Garry Brents and Jun Minowa; all three composers had contributed material to Dedicated Records' Various Artists compilation Great Messengers: Palms in 2010. Palko demanded that the composers submit their completed soundtracks by December 2014 and that their music last between eight to twelve minutes. When later interviewed by New Noise Magazine in 2024, Julien described Palko's approach as "quite unprepared and unprofessional; he had none of the scripts ready and was unable to give the slightest hint about what any of the films were to be. He did not even have a title in mind. In other words, making movies was just one of his many pipe dreams. But I only found this out later, after my soundtrack had been completed." He also told Transcending the Mundane "Palko was unable to provide me with any script material, scene ideas, or a basic plot; not even a title. He had no idea what any of the three films were to be about, he simply had a flight of fancy to direct movies."

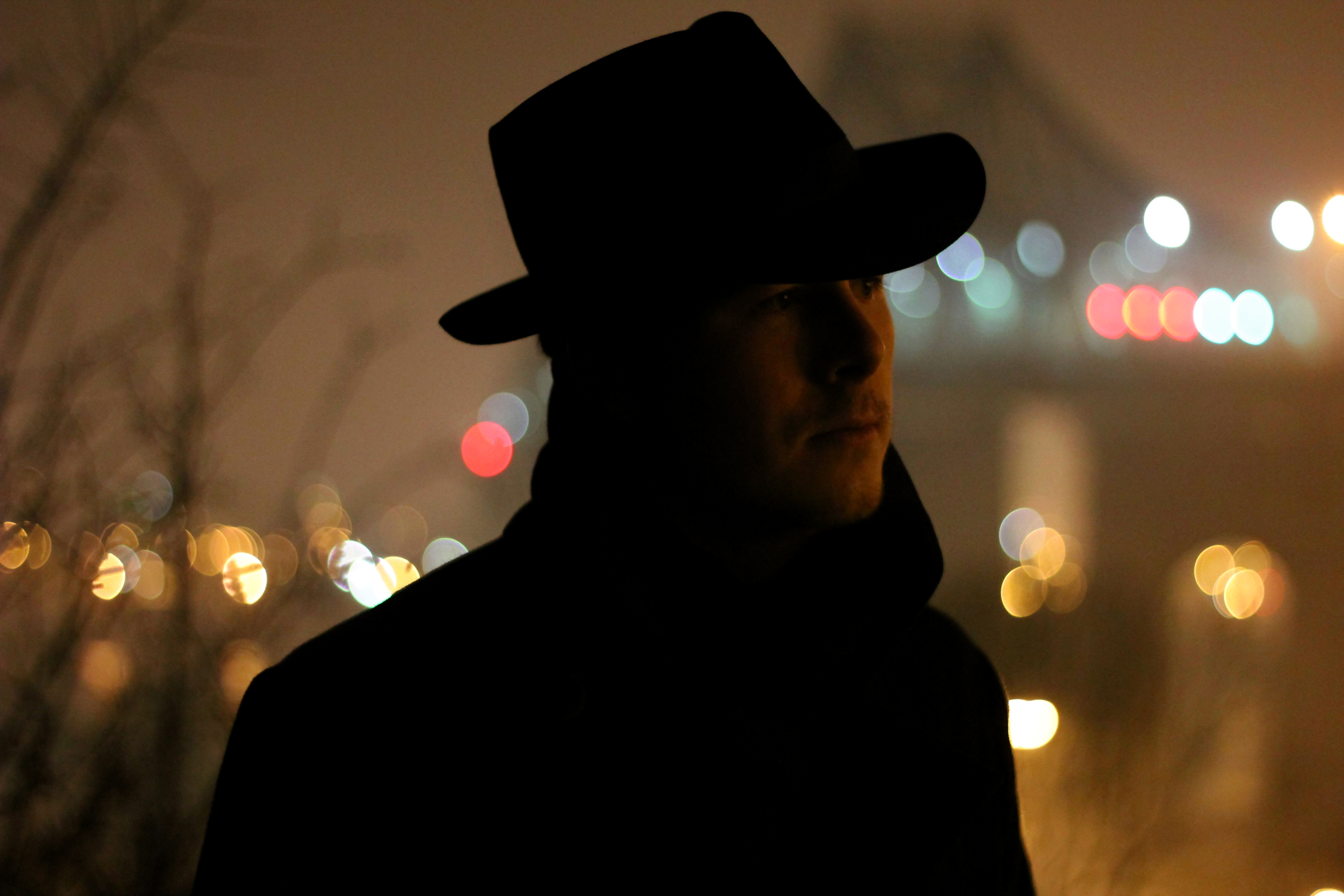
Vision Eternel photographed on Saint Helen's Island, Quebec on March 16, 2012, during the promotion of The Last Great Torch Song.

Nevertheless, as a cinephile, Julien was eager and excited at the opportunity to work on a film score. As he had been asked to compose music on a personal level, and not through the genre or stylistic restriction of one of his bands, the musician felt free to approach the music honestly and uninhibitedly. He described his process to The Obelisk as "a completely natural songwriting approach," though he later confessed to The Spill Magazine that "If I am asked to compose music, regardless of the project, it will always sound like Vision Eternel. My music has a distinct somber and melancholic sound because that is inherent to my personality. It is who I am. There would be no difference between music for a film and music for Vision Eternel, as far as style, sound, and production."

In early September 2014, Julien began to adapt and arrange the song he had started composing the previous month as the basis for the score. However, he opted to split the lengthy composition into multiple shorter pieces as he felt constrained by the lack of knowledge about the film. He elaborated on this with New Noise Magazine, stating: "I did not want to submit a single long song because it would have been difficult to sequence it properly into a film, especially one about which I knew nothing." He also told Idioteq: "The idea of composing and recording several short pieces, or movements, that built off of each other and used an arrangement of similar notes, resulted from this dilemma. It was my method of making progress on the soundtrack without a script." As such, Julien developed a series of cues and recurring themes, all revolving around a single leitmotif, which could be spliced and faded in and out at any time during the film's post-production without losing emotional build-up. Many of the songs were intentionally short, passive, and repetitive, while others were lengthier and more melodic, intended for important scenes, which Julien justified by explaining: "When I listen to film soundtracks, I hear a lot of repetition and a single motif that plays throughout. That was my goal."

== Recording and production ==
=== Recording the film score (October – November 2014) ===
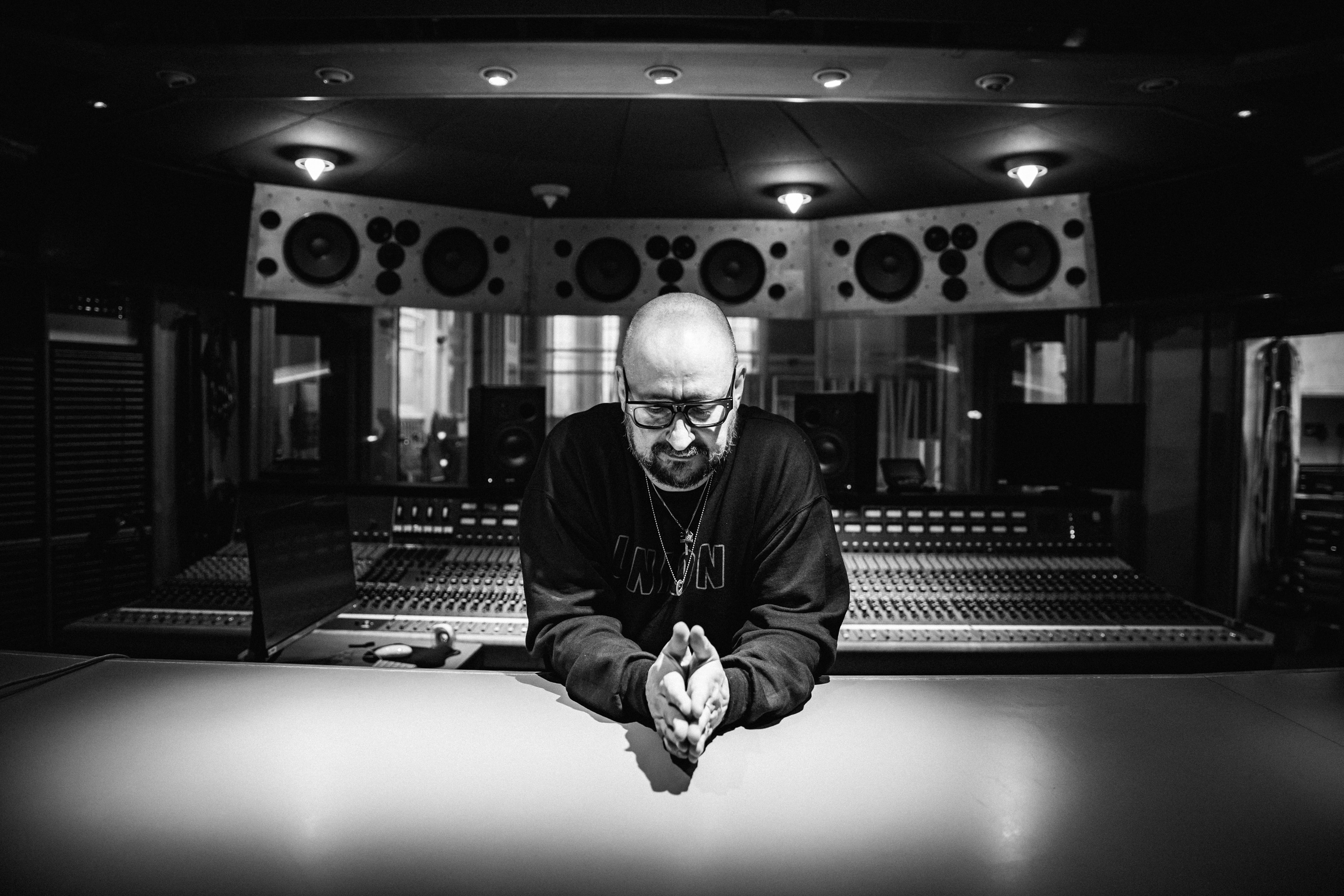
Composer Clint Mansell's 2009 Moon score was influential to Julien during the composing of Echoes from Forgotten Hearts.

After a month of composing and arranging, Julien began recording the score on October 4, 2014, at his home studio, Mortified Studios, in Saint-Hippolyte-of-Kilkenny, Quebec. The session lasted four weeks, until October 30, 2014, resulting in a fourteen-minute score divided into six songs. The music was instrumental and accomplished using only electric guitars, electric bass guitars, and an eBow. In the novella that accompanies Echoes from Forgotten Hearts' deluxe edition, The Making of Echoes from Forgotten Hearts - A Narrative of Vision Eternel's Soundtrack, Julien confided that he was influenced by Clint Mansell and his Moon score and soundtrack during the development of his score.

Around this time, Julien decided the music would be released as Vision Eternel instead of under his name. He told Idioteq: "I think that while this soundtrack was coming together, it already sounded like a Vision Eternel release," and The Spill Magazine: "I felt that the music most closely resembled what Vision Eternel was doing at that point." On October 31, 2014, Vision Eternel broke months of silence to announce via its Facebook page that it had a new extended play forthcoming for release in early 2015.

Julien began editing and mixing the music in October but planned to spend all of November 2014 mixing the material to his satisfaction. After nearly three months of work on the music, he contacted Palko to give him a progress update in November 2014. As told to Transcending the Mundane during an interview: "I was very excited to let him hear the music. With only minor mixing left, I told him that my soundtrack would be completed before the end of the month, as per his request. It was then that Palko revealed that he had abandoned the short films weeks prior. To make matters worse, he was far from nice about it and told me that I was wasting his time. I was deeply hurt by this." Julien later discovered that Palko had used the film's funds to finance a personal vacation to Europe. The composer also shared with New Noise Magazine that he was disappointed when Palko embarked on a smear campaign against Vision Eternel in early 2015 when Echoes from Forgotten Hearts was first released.

=== Reworking into an extended play (November – December 2014) ===
Unwilling to let his music go to waste, Julien returned to Mortified Studios to rework the score into a concept extended play. The second session spanned from November 18 to December 18, 2014, during which all of the material was re-edited and re-mixed, and a good portion of the songs were also re-recorded. Two new songs were composed, half of another was re-written, and one was dropped, which Julien felt was "too passive once the release was to be ingested not as a soundtrack but as an extended play." The sequencing of the tracks was also changed.

When asked about his process as a producer during an interview with Idioteq, Julien said: "I do not consider myself a producer. I simply took on the role of engineer, mixer, and producer by default because I needed to stay within budget and be self-sufficient in my solo projects, and while recording at my home studios." He also revealed that recording music is a stress factor and a chore for him because it distracts and takes the joy away from performing the songs. He also confided that he is "a bit of a perfectionist during recording, I often need multiple takes before I am happy with the final version of a song."

Julien explained that the soundtrack and extended play went through seven preview sessions, used to showcase the latest recordings and mixes. In each version, minor and major changes were made, including different guitar or bass guitar tracks on songs, new mixes, or track sequencing, until Julien was satisfied with the presentation of the material. The seventh preview version was released as Echoes from Forgotten Hearts; the first preview version was later included in the deluxe edition as the soundtrack version.

=== Post-production (December 2014 – January 2015; December 2021) ===
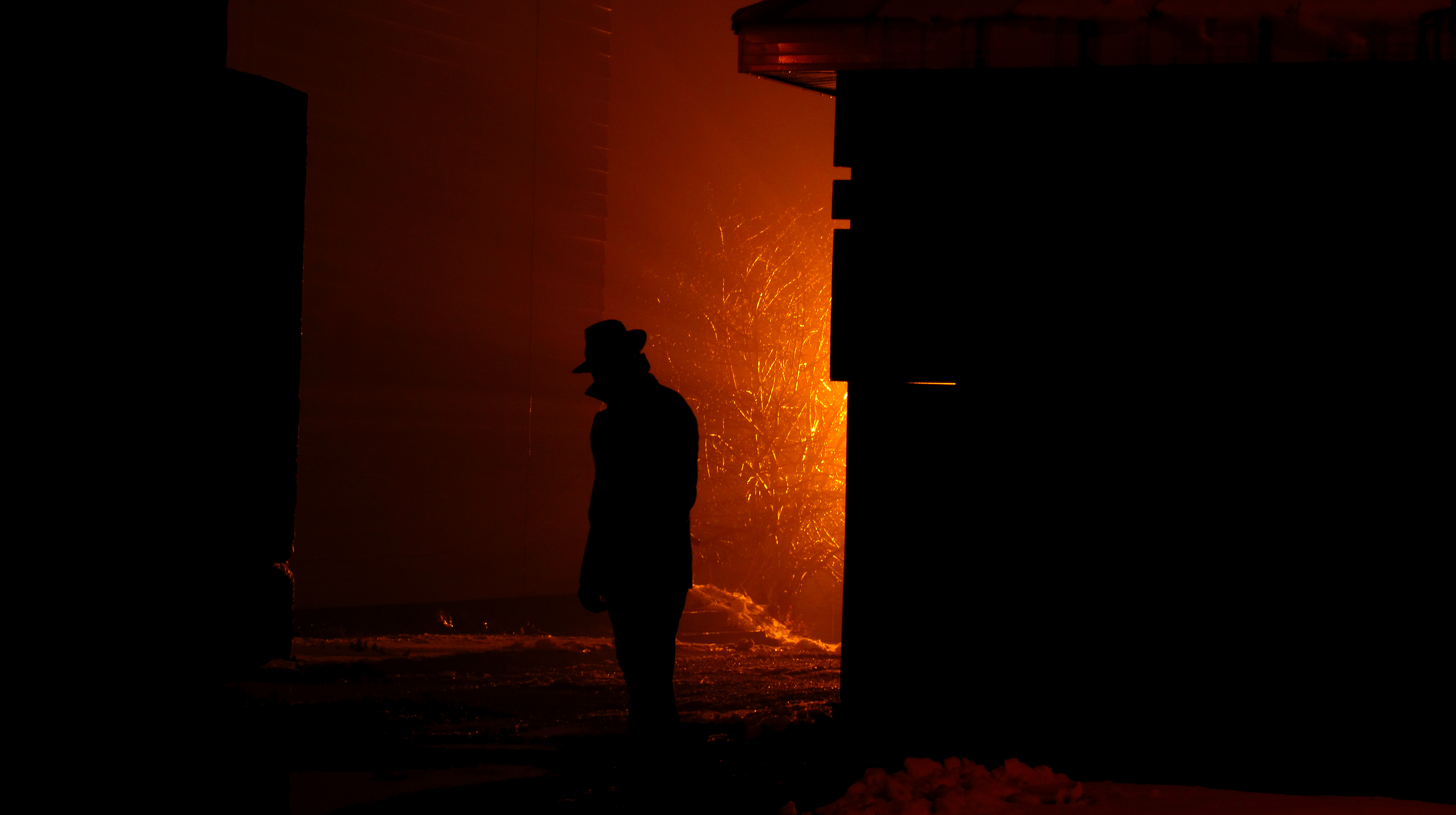
Vision Eternel photographed in Wexford, Quebec on December 23, 2015, for a canceled promotion of Echoes from Forgotten Hearts.

Once mixing was completed in December 2014, Julien asked ex-Vision Eternel band-mate Adam Kennedy to master the release. Kennedy had previously mastered Vision Eternel's third extended play, Abondance de périls, in 2010, and Julien hoped he would give the new release that same warmth and unified sound. In January 2015, Kennedy did three separate passes on a song, but Julien felt the result was more of a re-mix of the material rather than a balanced mastering. It was then decided that Echoes from Forgotten Hearts would be released without mastering. Two of Kennedy's three mixes were later included in the deluxe edition, while the remaining one was offered for free download on Vision Eternel's website in 2022, as part of its annual Valentine's Day Exclusive.

In December 2015, Garry Brents was secured to master the extended play, when it was to be released by Feather Witch, but that also did not pan out. Once the deluxe edition was confirmed in 2021, Echoes from Forgotten Hearts was mastered by Carl Saff at Saff Mastering in Chicago, Illinois. Saff worked on the material from December 3–15, 2021, which included the seven songs from the original version of Echoes from Forgotten Hearts, the six-song soundtrack version, and ten unreleased rehearsal recordings, demo versions, and alternate takes from the studio archives.

== Artwork ==
=== Original version (2015) ===
The original artwork for Echoes from Forgotten Hearts was created by Julien's then-best friend, Jeremy Roux, who had created previous designs and videos, and handled photography for the band, as well as for Julien's record company, Abridged Pause Recordings. Roux worked on three designs before one was accepted by Julien, though the musician later admitted that the final one was delivered less than a week before the release date and he did not have time to consider other options. The design was a subtle nod to the Moon soundtrack and film poster. Julien described the original artwork to The Obelisk as "more in line with the band's early artworks: it was extremely bland and without direction. It was nondescript. It faded into the background next to other ambient albums on a web-page. But that is what I was going for at the time; it was what I asked Roux to come up with." However, he also added "His heart was no longer in the project and I had to drag the artwork out of him. It felt rushed, forced, and without inspiration."

=== Deluxe edition (2024) ===
"Once interest in releasing this material resurfaced, in August 2020, I immediately thought that I should present Echoes from Forgotten Hearts differently from its original 2014/2015 version. I wanted to treat it as a new release, not as a simple re-packaging of the same content. I wanted existing fans (who may have been familiar with the digital version) to be interested just as much as new folks discovering it for the first time. It was important for me that I offer something new and fresh; I wanted to give people a reason to check it out."

—Alexander Julien, Find Your Sounds

When a deluxe edition of the extended play was first announced in 2020, Julien revealed it would feature new artwork, later stating: "My goal with this new presentation was to offer a completely different listening and viewing experience from the 2015 version of Echoes from Forgotten Hearts.” He felt the original artwork was no longer representative of the music he offered, adding: "Vision Eternel sort of falls between genres. And I would like people to approach my music from that perspective; that it is not just one genre, but a bit of several. For that reason, I do not look at my release artworks as needing to fit or represent imposed genres."

From October 2021 to January 2022, Julien worked on a mock-up for the new artwork, based on a combination of two posters of Charlie Chaplin's 1931 film City Lights, which he singled out as one of his favorite movies. He explained that since Echoes from Forgotten Hearts had originally been composed as a score, an artwork paying tribute to a film poster would fit the release's concept. The background, including the city landscape, sidewalk, and sky, is based on the film's original 1931 promotional poster, designed by Alvan Cordell Hadley, while Julien's portrait pose is based on the film's 1950 theatrical re-issue poster.

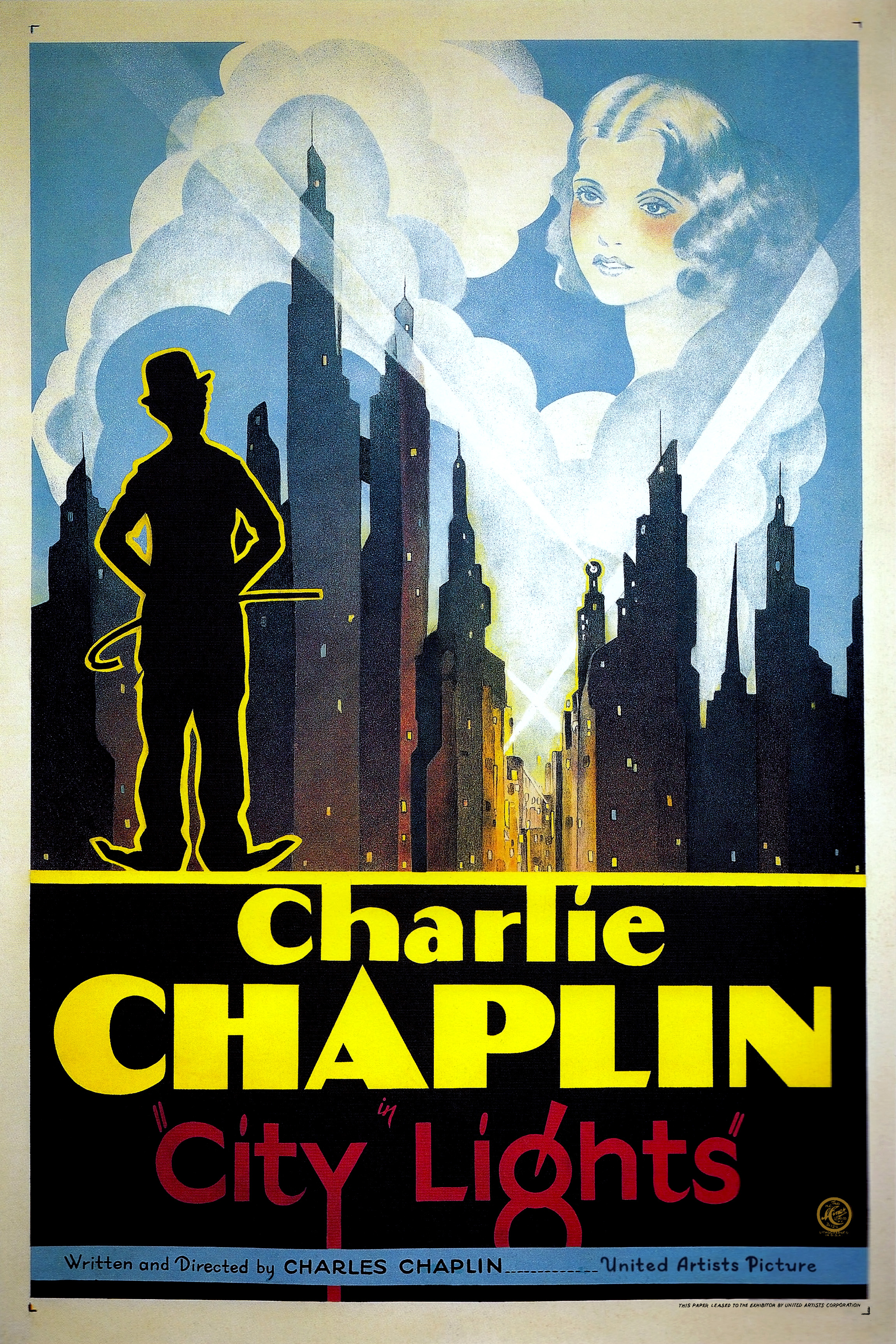
City Lights' 1931 theatrical poster, designed by Hap Hadley, upon which the deluxe edition artwork was based.

Julien said he was careful to respect Chaplin's image and work in his artwork, as he wanted it to be a tribute, not a duplicate or parody. He explained: "I took the 1931 poster and expanded it, not by stretching it, but by re-creating other buildings to the left and right, sidewalk to the bottom, and clouds and sky to the top of the image in Photoshop. I transformed the portrait image into a landscape because I wanted a 16×9 image that could be used as a gatefold cover." He also replaced actress Virginia Cherrill's face from the original theatrical poster with a moon, as a way to "create a visual connection and bring over the concept of Echoes from Forgotten Hearts' original 2014/2015 artwork, and pay tribute to Moon." Julien also opted not to hold a cane or wear the same Little Tramp attire in his pose, as a way of paying respect to Chaplin's character on the 1950 re-release poster, and instead stood in a manner that was similar but comfortable to him, wearing his own clothes.

He then commissioned American pulp illustrator Michael Koelsch, who had painted the cover artwork of Vision Eternel's For Farewell of Nostalgia in 2020. Koelsch painted the artwork twice; the first between February 12 and March 4, 2022, but this was rejected by Julien for being too Art Deco. To provide a more pulpy, realistic, and painterly look, Koelsch revised several things from Julien's mock-up, including removing the clouds from the sky, making the moon larger, and altering the skyscrapers' and buildings' shapes. From the modified mock-up, Koelsch painted the second and final artwork between April 26 and May 7, 2022, using colored pencils, rounded paintbrushes, acrylic paint, and an airbrush.

Julien worked on the layout and incorporated several of Roux's original artwork and photography in the deluxe edition's booklet. Frequent collaborator Rain Frances, who had painted material for several Vision Eternel releases, including For Farewell of Nostalgia, An Anthology of Past Misfortunes, the Lost Misfortunes series, as well as the annual Valentine's Day Exclusive, contributed artwork for the release as well, and her photography of the band is included extensively inside the booklet. The font that Julien selected for the deluxe edition, Town, was created by Jason Vandenberg at J Foundry, and was inspired by the old Vanity Fair magazine covers from the early 1930s, which he first noticed while watching the 1933 movie The Little Giant when Edward G. Robinson's character was reading an issue.

== Release and promotion ==
=== Failed plans and releases (2014 – 2017) ===
"Echoes from Forgotten Hearts has had a turbulent journey and it frequently seemed as if it was destined not to be released. But because I so believed in the music that I had composed and recorded, I coddled this extended play over the years and fought to get it released."

—Alexander Julien, Idioteq

Before Echoes from Forgotten Hearts was even completed, Julien contacted record companies to secure a physical release for the extended play. Nearly all of Vision Eternel's previous releases had been issued through the musician's record labels, Mortification Records and Abridged Pause Recordings, but Julien felt it was time to expand the band's horizons and reach a new fanbase. It took ten years for the material to be officially and properly released, since, as Julien put it: "It was postponed, rescheduled, canceled, and abandoned by several record labels on numerous occasions. Serious plans were made but the extended play was continuously dropped shortly before release. This is what I have been calling 'the Deadsy curse', because of a similar situation the group encountered with its debut album, and, to a lesser degree, its second album." According to Julien "Eleven record companies agreed to release Echoes from Forgotten Hearts, but wound up canceling it, at times only weeks before the release date."

The first record label Julien approached was New York-based Broken Limbs Recordings in September 2014, via a referral from Garry Brents, whose band, Cara Neir, was signed to the company. Broken Limbs Recordings initially offered to release the extended play on compact cassette but later that same month withdrew its offer because, as Julien put it: "Vision Eternel was dropped from Broken Limbs Recordings' roster because the owner, Peter Browne, found out that I wore fedora hats and described me as 'a loser'."

The band next secured a deal with Bulgarian record label Abandonment, which had already released music by Julien's other band, Soufferance, in 2013. The band was signed to Abandonment for about six months, from September 2014 to February 2015, during which plans were made for a compact cassette release. This wound up being canceled, too, as Julien explained: "In the end, Echoes from Forgotten Hearts was passed over in favor of another ambient release, a split tape between Mytrip and Timothy C. Holehouse; those artists were more established than Vision Eternel, so it came down to a business decision."

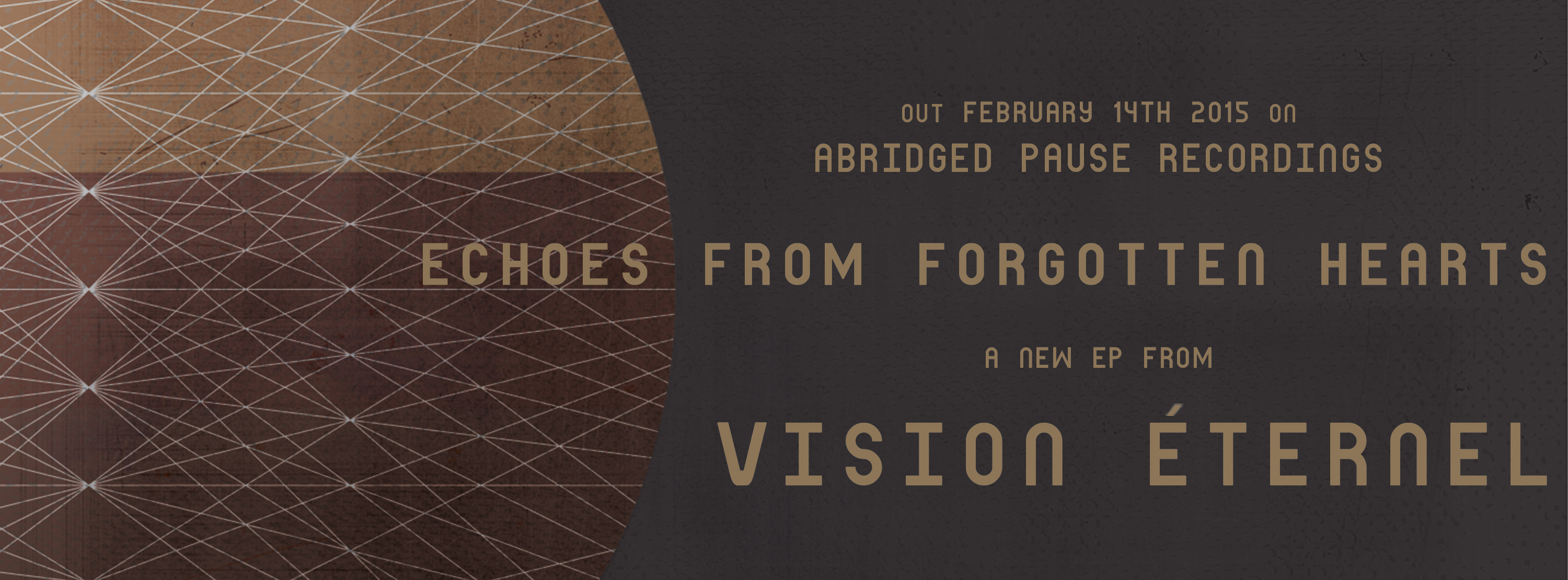
Digital flyer promoting Echoes from Forgotten Hearts' 2014 release on Abridged Pause Recordings.

With Valentine's Day 2015 approaching, Julien did not want to miss out on a tradition Vision Eternel had followed since its inception in 2007, to release new music on that day. He released Echoes from Forgotten Hearts digitally via Abridged Pause Recordings on February 14, 2015, but restricted it to only Bandcamp and did not do any promotion. The reasoning for this was that he was still hoping to secure a record deal to release the extended play physically.

In October 2015, another opportunity presented itself to Julien as a film composer. An artist and repertoire agent from Canadian synchronization licensing company Community Tree Music discovered Echoes from Forgotten Hearts on Bandcamp and was eager to sign the artist to an exclusive contract because, as he put it, "I was told that several filmmakers were eager to use my music as the soundtrack to their movies, and they were pretty insistent on signing me." Julien admitted that he missed his chance with this offer because he was busy with other projects and did not complete the paperwork in time.

In December 2015, Vision Eternel was signed to a three-album deal with start-up New York-based record label Feather Witch (since then renamed to Fiadh Productions). Unbeknownst to Julien before the signing, Feather Witch's owner, Bariann Tuite Leistner, was co-owner of Broken Limbs Recordings and was married to Peter Browne. The new label was to be run as an imprint of the latter company in cooperation with Halo of Flies Records, and Julien later confided that he was surprised by the interest given the brush-off he had been given a year prior. The record label's inaugural release was intended to be a cassette tape issue of Echoes from Forgotten Hearts, scheduled for release on February 14, 2016. The label proposed getting new artwork designed for special packaging, mastering the material, and organizing a premiere on webzine CVLT Nation.

Via Abridged Pause Recordings, Julien was required to forfeit the extended play's digital distribution rights and grant exclusive distribution rights to Feather Witch, which he did. In multiple interviews, he explained: "A couple of days later, I received a most unexpected telephone call in the middle of the night from the company's owner, inebriated, insulting me and my music. I was shocked. I could not understand what had happened. And from that moment on, the record label ignored me and I was forced to press for legal action just to reclaim the digital rights to my extended play." Julien later explained that the only reason he was able to regain the rights to his music was that he had not signed over the publishing rights, which were still owned by Abridged Pause Publishing, an imprint of Abridged Pause Recordings, and that his Abridged Pause companies were legally registered businesses in Canada, whereas Feather Witch had no legal standing. He told Transcending the Mundane: "It caused me great anxiety and led me to give up trying to get Echoes from Forgotten Hearts released."

=== Vision Eternel anniversary box set and music video (2017 – 2018) ===
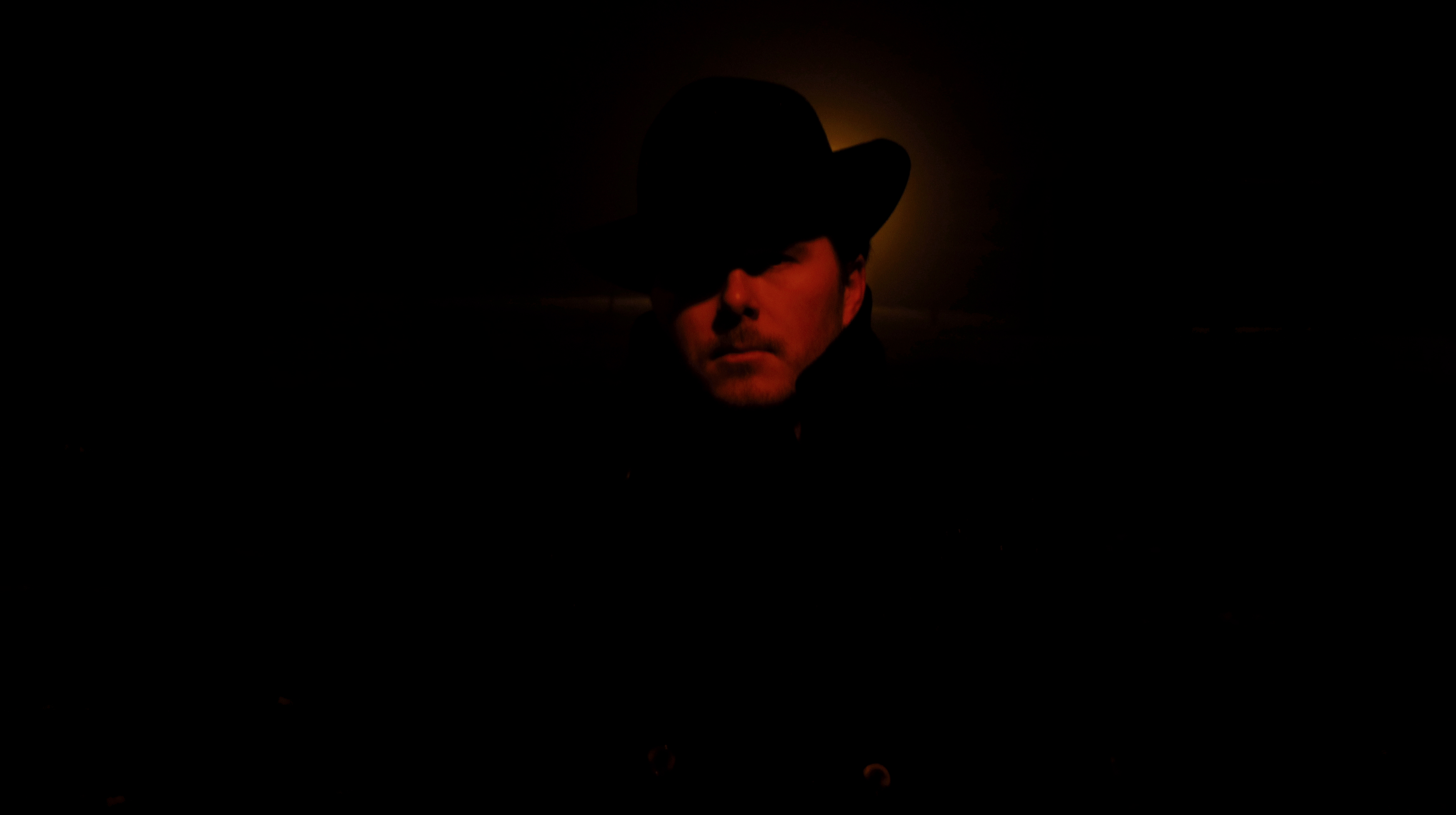
Vision Eternel photographed in Wexford, Quebec on December 23, 2015, for a canceled promotion of Echoes from Forgotten Hearts.

A year later, in December 2016, Julien began planning Vision Eternel's approaching tenth anniversary taking place in January 2017. Two releases were immediately organized: a digital re-issue of Vision Eternel's entire back-catalog (five extended plays) to major streaming and download platforms, and a retrospective box set titled An Anthology of Past Misfortunes comprising all five extended plays on compact discs. In keeping with the band's Valentine's Day connection, the digital re-issues (including Echoes from Forgotten Hearts) were available starting February 14, 2017. However, because of extensive delays with the box set, Julien opted to hold off on promoting the digital re-releases, as he planned to promote both together. The musician later told Transcending the Mundane: "I was very unlucky in this endeavor as well. Every single item in the boxed set had to be re-printed or re-pressed because the company with which I had placed my order, Analogue Media Technologies, ruined them. It was a nightmare." The An Anthology of Past Misfortunes box set, which included the first physical offering of Echoes from Forgotten Hearts, was finally released after a fourteen months delay, on April 14, 2018. Julien told ReGen Magazine: "Because of those errors, it was only released a year and two months later, by which time the tenth anniversary was long over and the boxed set had little impact."

During the band's tenth anniversary celebration, a music video was edited for the song "Pièce No. Trois" from Echoes from Forgotten Hearts. Originally planned for a music video by Julien's black ambient band, Soufferance, the footage was filmed by Jeremy Roux in Old Montreal on January 10, 2012. Soufferance had recently signed to Pale Noir and was required to submit a music video to help promote its upcoming album, Memories of a City; Julien selected the twelve-minute song "The Asphalt Jungle" as the subject. After the first night of filming, the pair ended up with 21 minutes of footage from 36 takes. Julien wanted at least 80 minutes of footage from which to work and asked Roux to schedule three or four more outings within the month (so the footage would have continuity) to finish the project, but the latter was unwilling. Soufferance was dropped by Pale Noir over a contractual dispute a week later.

With Soufferance's projects on hold, Julien shifted his attention to Vision Eternel's fourth extended play, The Last Great Torch Song, released on March 14, 2012. The footage was planned to be repurposed into a music video for "Sometimes in Longing Narcosis" (from The Last Great Torch Song); since the song was much shorter, at two and a half minutes, he convinced Roux that they would only need one more night of filming. However, before the pair went out again, Julien's external hard drive crashed on March 26, 2012, losing all of the master video files (in addition to audio and artwork master files for The Last Great Torch Song and Memories of a City). Julien later recalled the incident as "devastating" and that he "still feel awful whenever I think or write of it."

Two months later, on May 21, 2012, Julien managed to recover 20 of the 36 shots from the video shoot, but it took another two years, until March 14, 2014, for the remaining 16 shots to be salvaged. Since Julien was not working on Vision Eternel material at the time, the footage remained unused. Once Abridged Pause Recordings released Echoes from Forgotten Hearts on February 14, 2015, Julien considered editing the footage into a music video for the song "Pièce No. Sept," but his computer was unable to handle the footage, so it continued to sit unused for another three years.

External videos
- "Pièce No. Trois" music video from YouTube, filmed by Jeremy Roux in 2012 and edited by Vasiliy Atutov in 2017.

During the band's tenth anniversary celebration in 2017, Julien was again eager to produce a music video for the band, but it wasn't until March 29, 2017, when a fan reached out, that things began moving forward. Video editor and long-time Vision Eternel fan Vasiliy Atutov originally contacted Julien for permission to use some of the band's songs on a series of ambient videos he planned to produce. Instead, Julien proposed that he edit the unused footage into a music video for the song "Pièce No. Trois," which he said he selected instead of "Pièce Nos. Sept" because it was shorter and could make better use of the limited footage. Atutov edited the video between July 22-23, 2017.

The music video premiered on August 28, 2017, on webzine The Obelisk. JJ Koczan, editor of The Obelisk, opined about the video: "Like the song itself, the visual accompaniment for 'Pièce No. Trois' is deeply atmospheric, featuring strung together clips of Julien giving what essentially might be taken as a kind of sightseeing tour of Montreal — but, you know, an artsy sightseeing tour." The band considered producing another music video for the song "Pièce No. Sept," in promotion of the deluxe edition in 2024, but it was never made.

=== Failed plans and deluxe edition (2020 – 2024) ===
"I wanted people to take notice of this release, which had gone through many false starts over the years. Some may have been familiar with it from the digital edition, but it was still an obscure release in the band's catalog. To counter this perception, I wanted to offer the music differently. I wanted all-new artwork; I wanted the music re-mastered, and I wanted to offer more than just the same seven songs from the Extended Play Version available since 2015."

—Alexander Julien, New Noise Magazine

From 2017 to 2020, Julien worked on Vision Eternel's sixth extended play, For Farewell of Nostalgia, which was released on September 14, 2020, through American record label Somewherecold Records and Dutch record company Geertruida. The band announced that same month both labels would re-issue an expanded and remastered edition of Echoes from Forgotten Hearts in 2021. Geertruida was to release it on compact cassette (with the extended play version on side A and the score version on side B), while Somewherecold Records was to release it as a double-compact disc, with each version on separate discs. By mid-October 2014, however, Vision Eternel had withdrawn itself from the record label's roster and canceled that release because, as Julien told Transcending the Mundane: "The record company owner's overly vocal personal beliefs. He insisted that the bands on his record label partake in his political, religious, and topical events, but I do not mix personal beliefs with music. Vision Eternel has always remained neutral and unattached." He also conveyed the same reason when asked by New Noise Magazine.

When the Somewherecold Records edition was canceled, Julien asked Geertruida to put the compact cassette edition on hold while he secured another record deal for the compact disc edition. It took a year before interest in the re-issue was picked up by Russian record label Frozen Light in October 2021. The owner initially agreed to release it on compact disc but had a habit of disappearing for months, which made Julien uncertain about the company's stability and he looked elsewhere.

Later in October 2021, Vision Eternel signed to release Echoes from Forgotten Hearts on compact disc through a co-production deal between Latvian/Austrian record label Beverina Productions and Russian company Casus Belli Musica. The labels upgraded the release from a planned digipak to a deluxe digibook, including a 52-page booklet. Julien then revised the track listing and increased the number of songs on the re-issue by including ten demos, unused takes, and alternate mixes. He also began writing extensive liner notes for the booklet by consulting his studio logs and band journals. He told Idioteq: "I had already planned to include extended liner notes and credits with the release, but with that offer, I suddenly needed enough content to fit a minimum of twelve pages (and a maximum of fifty-two pages). The idea of writing out the whole story of this release was developed from this dilemma. And I wrote, and wrote… Before I knew it, I had been writing for three months and the fifty-two pages were filled. There was no room left for images!" The booklet (eventually released in a further expanded 80-page version by Geertruida) was described by journalist Aaron Badgley for The Spill Magazine as "everything about this album you would ever want to know" and "the long journey of the release, and although it is very honest, it is also a story of perseverance and a belief in one's self and art."

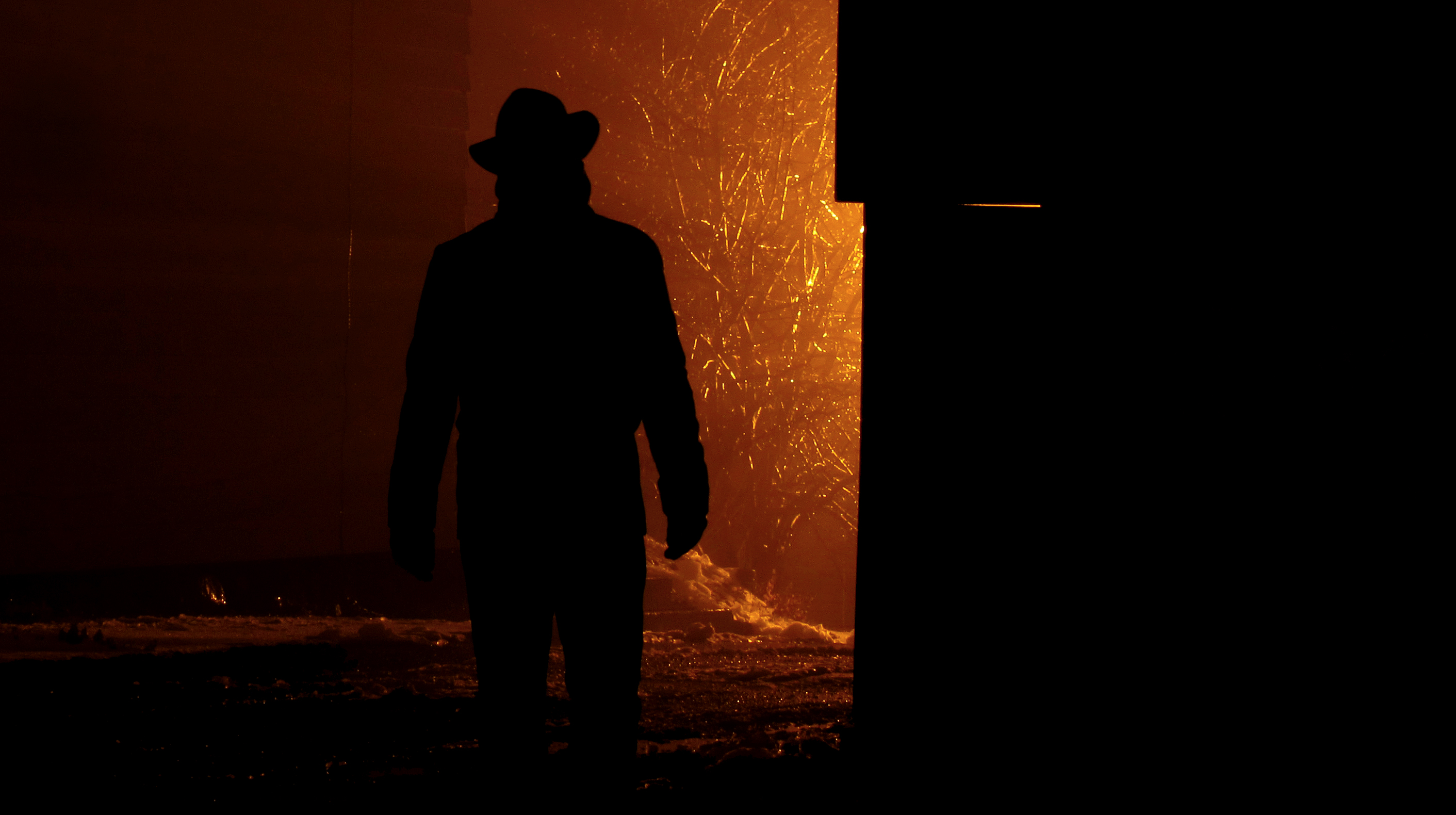
Vision Eternel photographed in Wexford, Quebec on December 23, 2015, for a canceled promotion of Echoes from Forgotten Hearts.

With the deluxe edition scheduled for release on February 14, 2022, Julien commissioned Michael Koelsch and Rain Frances to design new artwork and Carl Saff to remaster its content. The artwork and mastering each took longer than planned to complete and by the time the band had the masters in hand, a war in Europe had broken out forcing the two record labels to dissolve their partnership, thereby canceling the release. Several weeks later, the band received an offer from Beverina Productions to release the compact disc alone, but with a stripped down packaging and booklet. Julien began reworking the layouts for the release, while Beverina Productions searched for a replication plant to handle the work. After four months of planning and frequent communication, the record label suddenly stopped answering the band's emails and the release was presumed canceled.

When the release was initially delayed from its February 14, 2022 release date, Vision Eternel instead commemorated its usual Valentine's Day Exclusive by offering for free download two songs omitted from the forthcoming deluxe edition. The first was an unused mix/mastering of "Pièce No. Un" by Adam Kennedy; the second was an early and unused version of "Pièce No. Deux," before it was re-recorded. The band also submitted the remastered version of "Pièce No. Sept" for Fruits de Mer Records' double compact disc Various Artists compilation Sound Clouds, which was released on June 5, 2022.

By August 2022, the band had secured a new compact disc-releasing deal with Bulgarian record label Mahorka. Discussions over the packaging for the deluxe edition went on for three months until the company's owner finally acknowledged that he could not afford the costly release. Meanwhile, Frozen Light's owner had returned from an extended absence, and he offered to release Echoes from Forgotten Hearts in the same deluxe digibook packaging as the one prepared for Beverina Productions and Casus Belli Musica, including the 52-page booklet. The release date was set for February 14, 2023, and the band printed promotional material in anticipation. But the release was again canceled, as Julien explained to Transcending the Mundane: "A month before the release date, the owner of Frozen Light vanished (once again) and has been unheard of since. I have no idea what happened to that release or if it even made it to the pressing plant."

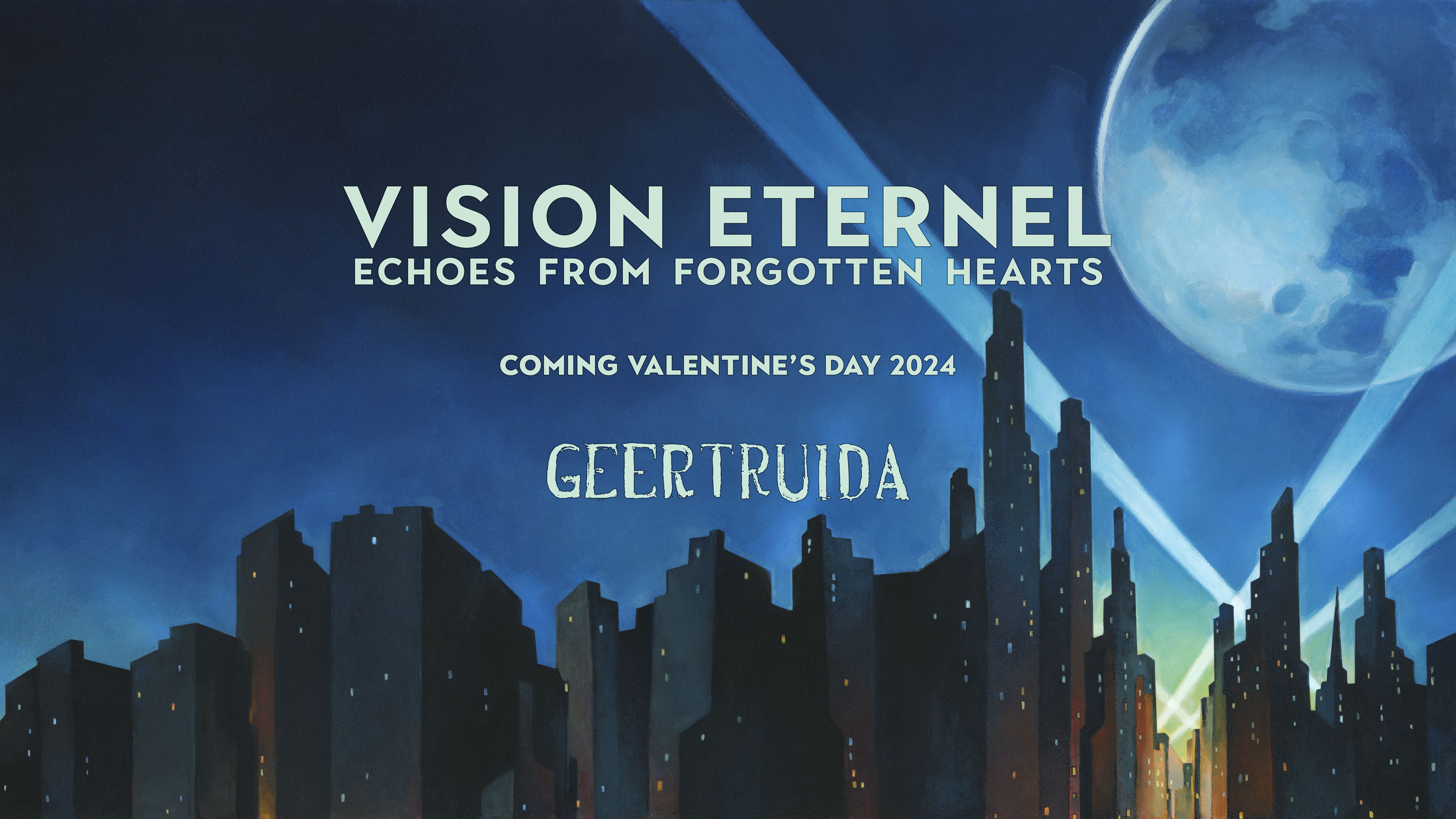
Digital flyer promoting Echoes from Forgotten Hearts' 2024 deluxe edition release on Geertruida.

Julien later confessed to New Noise Magazine: "At that point, things were going so poorly that Geertruida's compact cassette edition was also canceled, this one due to our inability to agree on a packaging that included the lengthy liner notes I had written." He further told Transcending the Mundane: "With the added pressure, Geertruida's owner and I began to argue over the details of the packaging, and shortly thereafter, the compact cassette edition was also canceled. That was very hard for me because he was a good guy and we were friends." Julien also admitted to ReGen Magazine: "I felt hopeless. I cried a lot over this project." In March 2023, Julien was still shopping the release to record companies.

In September 2023, Julien and Geertruida's owner, Yannick Tinbergen, reconciled and, acknowledging that too much work had gone into the release over the years, agreed to pull their resources. At that point, Julie gave up on the compact disc and vinyl editions, and instead focused on presenting an impressive compact cassette and digital edition with Geertruida. During the multi-year delay, the pair had often discussed packaging, evolving it from a single tape held in a clear Norelco case to a double tape held in a white thermoform box. The tapes eventually released in the box set edition come in two different colors. The box set also includes a numbered postcard with a download code, stickers, and the upgraded liner notes in an 80-page booklet. Julien described the booklet as a novella, but: "not a fiction story, it is a detailed account of the making of this soundtrack and extended play. It is classified as a novella because of its total word count; it is longer than a short story but too brief for a novel." He added: "The booklet is designed beautifully and artistically, more like a magazine or art book than a novel." It also contains 70 images from the band archives. He told Idioteq: "I fought for its inclusion in the Deluxe Edition, not (just) for my artistic vanity, but also because I strive to give Vision Eternel fans something special and original with our physical releases."

=== Distribution and promotion ===
"The highlighting of the material's tenth recording anniversary was not planned, it just took this long to get it properly released! The mention of the ten years came to me while working on the press release in late 2023. It struck me as both meaningful (Vision Eternel is deep into concepts) and incredible that this release had been postponed, canceled, and rescheduled so much that ten years had gone by!"

—Alexander Julien, Idioteq

On November 9, 2023, the band announced that the deluxe edition of Echoes from Forgotten Hearts would be released for Valentine's Day on February 14, 2024. Julien said he did not realize an entire decade had gone by until the release was nearly out and he was working on promotional material. It marked the first time the extended play was released properly and with promotion.

Pre-orders for the deluxe edition started on January 16, 2024, when Invisible Oranges premiered the previously unreleased song "Pièce No. Trois (Demo)", a month before the official release date. The deluxe edition was distributed digitally by Dutch distributor Dox Records (via Geertruida), while physical copies of the box set were handled by Clear Spot International and Shiny Beast Music Mailorder in Europe.

== Critical reception ==
Professional ratings
Review scores
Source	Rating
The Spill Magazine	4.5/5 stars

Although Echoes from Forgotten Hearts was not promoted when originally released in 2015, its subsequent reissues received an overall positive critical reception. The press generally had difficulty agreeing on a single genre to describe the extended play, offering instead a mix of several styles, including ambient, post-rock, shoegaze, drone, ethereal, post-black metal, experimental rock, and minimal.

Jon Rosenthal of Invisible Oranges described it as "moody instrumental guitar music," while Julie River at New Noise Magazine called it a "long, slow, softer version of shoegaze" delivered through "a gorgeously melodic wall of sound."

After playing the extended play in full on his CFRU-FM radio program, Here Today, Aaron Badgley described its sound as: "This is a very unique album. It's not... it's hard to categorize the music... it's not ambient, it's not... anything other than just beautiful music. It evokes images in your mind as you listen to it. [...] And the music is outstanding. As I said before, it's hard to categorize this music. And I give that a great deal of credit to Alex and his vision as to what the sound should be." Later during the show, Badgley praised the deluxe edition, saying: "There's a lot on this double cassette package. It's got loads of new stuff that no one's ever heard before. It's just fantastic. [...] The packaging is quite stunning. This beautiful, and I'm gonna stretch this, just beautiful packaging. There's two cassettes, which by the way sound amazing, there's a novella, it's not a novel, but Alex has laid out everything about this album you would ever want to know in an eighty-page plus booklet. And it comes in a beautiful clamshell packaging with other little stuff thrown in too. And it just sounds and looks absolutely beautiful. I can't tell you how beautiful it is."

When Badgley interviewed the band for The Spill Magazine he wrote "The music is instrumental, usually sparse, and simply beautiful and artistic. Perhaps most impressive with this rerelease is the beautiful packaging that Julien took a great deal of time and energy to make it absolutely stunning."

Badgley further praised the release in his separate The Spill Magazine review, rating it 4.5 out of 5 stars. He wrote "This album/package has had a long journey, but the end result is well worth the effort and time put into it. This deluxe edition of Echoes from Forgotten Hearts is quite brilliant. Everything, from the music to the packaging, has been created with a great deal of care and passion. It is an excellent example of how deluxe versions should look and sound. The album opens with 'Pièce № Un (Extended Play Version)'. The ambient, moody song is the perfect introduction to the EP and the music. The album is instrumental, but it is not all ambient, Julien has written many different melodies, some more guitar based, and some more layered. Each song builds on itself and the end result is a very dramatic sound. Listen to 'Pièce № Sept (Extended Play Version)' and enjoy the use of guitar and how it forms a beautiful drone-like base. It is beautiful. Hearing the original soundtrack and demos allows the listener into a small piece of Julien's creative process."

He continued: "It is interesting to listen to the demo, the soundtrack version to the extended version. 'Pièce № Six' is a great example. One hears the sparseness of the demo, to the layered soundtrack version to the fully arranged extended version. An Unused Version is also included. But it does demonstrate how the music developed. The Adam Kennedy 'remixes' are also a welcome addition and add a different dimension to the music. The only way to describe this release is beautiful. An 80-page novella about the long journey of the release, and although it is very honest, it is also a story of perseverance and a belief in one's self and art. The photos, and overall presentation are outstanding. Having the music on cassette gives it a wonderful warmth and adds to the feeling. It is extremely well recorded and well produced on tape. Echoes from Forgotten Hearts is a very visual album, even though it is instrumental. From beginning to end, the music transports the listener to a different time and place. It is not retro, quite the opposite, but it does take one out of their current realm into a different time and place. It is an emotional and very deep release. There is a lot going on in the music, which is best enjoyed in one listening."

John Rojas at Idioteq called the release a "hidden gem" and described the deluxe edition as "offering a counterpoint of depth and reflection, promising listeners a voyage through the emotional landscapes of heartbreak and introspection. This limited edition is not just a collection of songs but a meticulously crafted artifact, complete with an 80-page booklet and an exclusive postcard, inviting fans into the intimate world of its creation." Of Julien, he wrote "The visionary force behind Vision Eternel has transformed personal tumult into a sonic odyssey that transcends the typical." and furthered that he is "an artist committed to exploring the depths of human experience through music."

In a video critique of the release for Metal Trenches, reviewer Flight of Icarus called the music "pretty, very pretty, very chill, kind of relaxing music." However, he expressed disdain for the artwork of the deluxe edition, calling it "cheesy" and a "really garbage album cover," further describing it as evoking "some Frank Sinatra impersonator or something."

When JJ Koczan at The Obelisk reviewed the extended play in 2017, he described the music as "seven brief individual tracks of wistful guitar lines and serene dronescapes" and an "ambient solo-project of Montreal-based texture-weaver." He went on "The balance that a 'Pièce No. Deux' is able to strike by sounding so broad and wide open and yet only being 1:47 is striking, and it makes the release flow together all the more as a work on a single emotional thematic, and while it all only winds up being 14 minutes in total, Julien is able to bring that thematic to life in that time with depth and grace, so that when the relative sprawl of the 3:45 closer 'Pièce No. Sept,' takes hold, one only wishes it would go on further. Fabrizio Lusso of WhiteLight//WhiteHeat later also singled out "Pièce No. Deux" in his list Picks of the Week.

Koczan continued with a review of "Pièce No. Trois"'s music video, stating "Each one works in a roughly similar vein of minimalist cinematic drama, something vague but hopeful in Julien's shimmering guitar tonality and gentle approach, but they remain distinctive with pauses between and, short as they are and short as the whole outing is, never get lost or too caught up in any individual moment. One might think of each Vision Eternel track as fleeting, and that would seem to be the intent. Atmosphere over impact. Impression over reality. Evocation over direct narrative. Vision Eternel has a considerable back catalog amassed of these headphone-ready meditations, and as "Pièce No. Trois" explores layering in strum and drone guitar, the depths Julien brings to bear so quickly in a 90-second video impress all the more for the efficiency that both matches the scope of the band and doesn't make the material feel rushed or overblown in terms of arrangement. There's a grace to Vision Eternel's output across Echoes from Forgotten Hearts that carries into the mood and has a melancholy effect on the listener. It asks little for indulgence and delivers much in immersion."

Covering its re-issue in 2024, Koczan described the music as "evocative and emotive ambient" and "emotive and textural solo cinematic drone, somehow-post-black-metal soundscaping." Covering the box set, he went on "A package like this has similar intricacies and quirks of sound to match the presentation, even unto its art-deco design look and entrancing film-noir engagement. I do, however, think this might be the most expansive version of a release Vision Eternel has had, however. Even with tapes, it doesn't seem like a minor production to put it all together — 80-page book, postcard, whatnot — but life doesn't often give you a chance to do something like this with your work, whatever you do, so when you get one I think you probably take it."

== Track listing ==
Credits are adapted from the extended play's liner notes. All music is composed and arranged by Alexander Julien.

Echoes from Forgotten Hearts track listing
No.	Title	Length
1.	"Pièce No. Un"	2:15
2.	"Pièce No. Deux"	1:47
3.	"Pièce No. Trois"	2:12
4.	"Pièce No. Quatre"	0:47
5.	"Pièce No. Cinq"	1:23
6.	"Pièce No. Six"	2:14
7.	"Pièce No. Sept"	3:44
Total length:		14:22

Deluxe Edition bonus tracks
No.	Title	Length
8.	"Piece No. One" (Soundtrack Version)	2:10
9.	"Piece No. Two" (Soundtrack Version)	2:19
10.	"Piece No. Three" (Soundtrack Version)	1:18
11.	"Piece No. Four" (Soundtrack Version)	1:25
12.	"Piece No. Five" (Soundtrack Version)	2:10
13.	"Piece No. Six" (Soundtrack Version)	3:45
14.	"Piece No. Two" (Demo Version)	1:53
15.	"Pièce No. Deux" (Demo Version)	1:02
16.	"Pièce No. Sept" (Demo Version)	5:11
17.	"Pieces In Rehearsal"	6:44
18.	"Pièce No. Six" (Demo Version)	0:57
19.	"Pièce No. Trois" (Demo Version)	2:06
20.	"Pièce No. Six" (Unused Version)	1:50
21.	"Pièce No. Deux" (Unused Version)	1:19
22.	"Pièce No. Un" (Adam Kennedy Mix One)	2:11
23.	"Pièce No. Un" (Adam Kennedy Mix Two)	2:16
Total length:		52:57

== Personnel ==
Credits are adapted from the extended play's liner notes.

Vision Eternel

- Alexander Julien – electric guitar, electric bass guitar, eBow

Production

- Alexander Julien – recording engineer, mixer, producer at Mortified Studios; design concept, layout, liner notes
- Adam Kennedy – mixer at Orpheus Productions (deluxe edition)
- Carl Saff – mastering engineer at Saff Mastering (deluxe edition)
- Yannick Tinbergen – analog transfer, packaging at Geertruida (deluxe edition)
- Jeremy Roux – cover artwork (original version), photography (deluxe edition)
- Michael Koelsch – cover artwork painting at Koelsch Studios (deluxe edition)
- Rain Frances – additional artwork painting at Rain Frances Art, photography (deluxe edition)
- Anthony Bowe – typography (original version)
- Jason Vandenberg – typography (deluxe edition)
- JJ Koczan – liner notes (deluxe edition)

== Release history ==
Release formats for Echoes from Forgotten Hearts
Region	Date	Label	Format	Catalog
Worldwide	February 14, 2015	Abridged Pause Recordings	Digital (Bandcamp only)	APR11
Worldwide	February 14, 2017	Abridged Pause Recordings	Digital (General release)	APR11
Canada	April 14, 2018	Abridged Pause Recordings	CD	APR14.5
Netherlands	February 14, 2024	Geertruida	Double Tape Box Set (Deluxe Edition)	TRUI128
Worldwide	February 14, 2024	Geertruida	Digital (Deluxe Edition)	TRUI128
