= Jack Callahan (musician) =

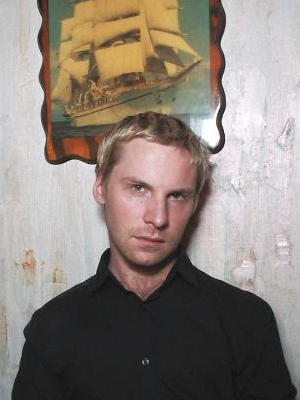
- Jack Callahan in 2019

Background information
- Also known as: die Reihe
- Origin: Minneapolis, Minnesota, U.S.
- Genres: Experimental; Computer Music; Electronic; Noise Music; Podcast Music
- Years active: 2008–present
- Labels: Bánh Mì Verlag; anòmia; NNA Tapes; Ascetic House

Jack Callahan is an American experimental musician and audio engineer. He is best known for performing under the moniker die Reihe, taken from the journal of the same name edited by Herbert Eimert and Karlheinz Stockhausen.

== Musical Activities ==
Callahan's music deals with "microscopic focus and reflective analysis", "examining and abstracting a different musical element on each release," "simple forms, limited scales, and generally reduced materials," "silence, a logical progression and a definable set of methodologies," "blurring of form and method," and "[c]reating structure out of a simple concept ... [w]here you don't need to know about academic music ... to understand what's happening."

Callahan grew up in Minneapolis, Minnesota, where he learned to play the drums as a child. During his teenage years, he moved to Saint Louis, Missouri to attend high school. He became involved in the local Saint Louis DIY punk and experimental music scene, playing drums in several local punk, no wave, and free improvisation outfits, most notably at the Lemp Neighborhood Arts Center (LNAC). He volunteered for and was a board member of LNAC from 2007 to 2012, where he learned to do live sound for shows and where he performed some of his earliest compositions.

In 2011 he studied privately with composer Jürg Frey in Aarau, Switzerland. In 2013 he participated in the Ostrava Days residency in Ostrava, the Czech Republic at which he had an orchestral work, If You Cannot Ignore the Response – Delay It, performed by the Janáček Philharmonic Orchestra.

Since 2013 he has run the experimental music label Bánh Mì Verlag.

In April 2019 he co-curated the festival Neo-Pastiche: Changes in American Music at Black Mountain College Museum + Arts Center in Asheville, NC, which featured performances by Eugene Chadbourne, Jeff Witscher, Petr Kotik, the S.E.M. Ensemble performing pieces by Julius Eastman, Morton Feldman, John Cage plus other contemporary experimental artists.

As a drummer he has toured as a member of Sunburned Hand of the Man and Home Blitz.

As an audio engineer he toured for many years as a live sound engineer for Thurston Moore. He runs a mastering studio in Ridgewood, Queens and has mastered releases by Cloud Nothings, Ryley Walker, Jeff Witscher, Peter Ablinger and many more.

== Callahan & Witscher ==
After over a year of bicoastal collaboration, in 2019 at an evening-length concert of their works at ISSUE Project Room Callahan & Jeff Witscher performed their large collaborative piece What Happens on Earth Stays on Earth:

Taking the familiar Q&A format as its basic form, the piece functions as an expanded generative interview between multiple speakers — both human and technological — as an unhinged, overlapping narrative of contemporary life. Begun in 2017 as an idea, WHOESOE consists of a series of prompts given to a selection of interviewees (Madalyn Merkey, Asha Sheshadri, Colleen O’Connor, Nihal Ramchandani, Daren Ho, and Josh Haringa) whose responses are recorded. The piece is organized from this material with each staging being one of many possible realizations. An experiment in the modularity of common drama, the piece shares sensibilities with A.A. meetings, group therapy sessions, formalist and Fluxus generative poetry experiments, or Robert Ashley’s television operas — all operations that express tension between inner monologue and group communication. Although both Witscher and Callahan are known for their discrete compositions and far-ranging work under various monikers, recently they have been forwarding primary descriptors such as “Music Art” and “Sound Music” as formal headings that re-assert the simplicity of their own respective practices. What Happens on Earth Stays on Earth is an intersection of these individual approaches — a savage showcase of both narrative and music’s destinies to “go nowhere but here.”

In late 2020 Callahan & Witscher founded the contemporary music label Flea. Their first two releases were recordings of performances from Callahan's Neo-Pastiche: Changes in American Music festival. Callahan & Witscher have released a number of collaborative records since 2019. Their music has been described as "disturbing and ridiculous, but a force to be reckoned with" and "[h]yper-disorienting... [having] a playfully disruptive and irreverent attitude and aptitude for dis/jointed sound."

== Discography ==
=== As die Reihe ===
- Music Demonstration (Bánh Mì Verlag, 2014)
- Ascetic House (Ascetic House, 2014)
- From Minna (Salon, 2015)
- Trap Studies (anòmia, 2015)
- Housed (NNA Tapes, 2016)
- Vocoder (anòmia, 2018)
- Toward Agave Expressionism (Bánh Mì Verlag, 2019)
- 106 Kerri Chandler Chords (Psychic Liberation, 2019)
- Tragedy In A Sense Is A Kind Of Psychic Flavor Of This Loneliness (Stellage, 2020)
- Loft Classics (DDS, 2022)

=== As Callahan & Witscher ===
- The Past, Present And Future Of Experimental Music (Uncut GRM) (Flea, 2020)
- Stockhausen Syndrome (Flea, 2021)
- ISSUES (What Happens on Earth Stays on Earth) (Flea, 2022)
- Think Differently (Post Present Medium, 2024)
- Sorry To Hear That (Post Present Medium, 2026)

=== Other Collaborations ===
- Misfired Empathy (Stellage, 2021) with Asha Sheshadri
