= List of drone artists =

The following is a list of notable artists who play, compose, have played, or have composed albums or pieces of drone music or drone metal.

== A ==
- Oren Ambarchi

== B ==
- William Basinski
- Boris
- Bull of Heaven

== C ==
- Ethel Cain
- Laura Cannell
- Celer
- Lawrence Chandler
- Tony Conrad
- Clayton Counts

== D ==
- Kyle Bobby Dunn

== E ==
- Earth
- Emeralds

== G ==
- Growing (band)

== H ==
- Keiji Haino
- Tim Hecker

== I ==
- Rafael Anton Irisarri

== J ==
- James Leland Kirby
- Jo Blankenburg

== K ==
- Neil Keener

== L ==
- Lankum

== M ==
- Kali Malone

== N ==
- Natural Snow Buildings
- Phill Niblock

== O ==
- ØXN

== R ==
- Éliane Radigue

== S ==
- Stars of the Lid
- Sunn O)))
- Swans (band)

== T ==
- Theatre of Eternal Music
- The Dead Texan

== V ==
- Vibracathedral Orchestra
- Vision Eternel

== W ==
- Yoshi Wada

== Y ==
- Yellow Swans
- La Monte Young
