= Jeff Witscher =

Electronic musician

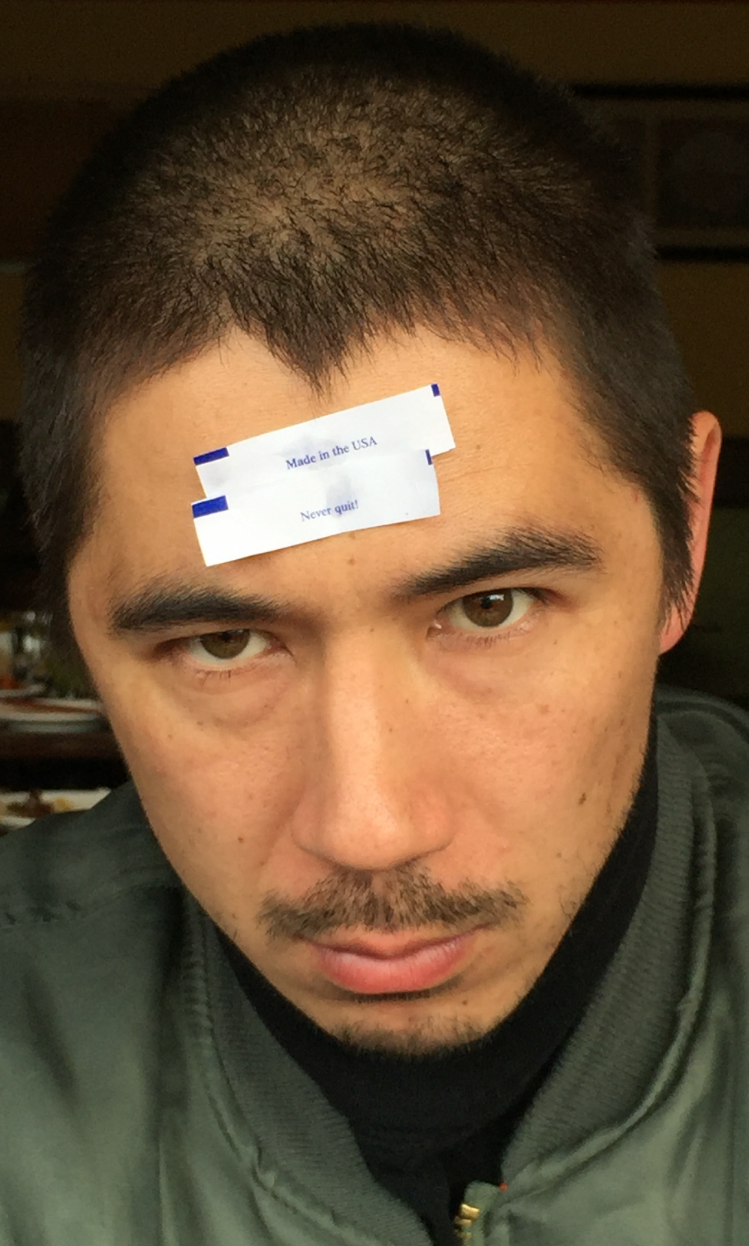
- Jeff Witscher in 2019

Background information
- Also known as: Rene Hell, Secret Abuse, Marble Sky, Abelar Scout, Impregnable
- Born: August 13, 1983 (age 42)
- Origin: Long Beach, California, U.S.
- Genres: Electronic; computer music; experimental; noise music; podcast music
- Years active: 2001–present
- Labels: PAN

Jeff Witscher (born August 13, 1983) is an American electronic musician.

== Biography ==
Witscher has recorded and performed under many aliases, of which the best-known is Rene Hell.

Witscher got his start in the underground music scene in Los Angeles, CA in the early 2000s performing with his brother Greg in groups such as Rainbow Blanket and Cruel Face. In 2004 he started the label Callow God, releasing music by many important west coast Harsh Noise artists. Following a move to Iowa City in 2007 Witscher began using the moniker Rene Hell. During this time he began the label Agents of Chaos, on which he released the earliest Rene Hell releases along with releases by Keith Fullerton Whitman, Greg Davis and many others.

In 2013 he released Vanilla Call Option on PAN.

In 2018 he released Approximately 1,000 Beers under his name on his own imprint Salon.

In April 2019 he performed at the festival Neo-Pastiche: Changes in American Music at Black Mountain College Museum + Arts Center in Asheville, NC alongside Petr Kotik, the S.E.M. Ensemble and other contemporary experimental artists.

In May 2019 Witscher and Jack Callahan performed their collaborative piece What Happens on Earth Stays on Earth at ISSUE Project Room. In late 2020 Callahan and Witscher founded the contemporary music label Flea.

== Discography ==
=== As Rene Hell ===
- Vanilla Call Option LP (PAN, 2013)
- Music for Reliquary House / In 1980 I Was a Blue Square (split with Oneohtrix Point Never LP (NNA Tapes, 2012)
- The Terminal Symphony LP (Type, 2011)
- Porcelain Opera LP (Type, 2010)

=== As Jeff Witscher ===
- Bifurcating A Resounding No! CD (Salon, 2014)
- Approximately 1,000 Beers CD (Salon, 2018)
- Cob Music Cassette (Bánh Mì Verlag, 2019)
