= Octa Möbius Sheffner =

- Also known as: Asleep Country
- Born: Octa Möbius Sheffner; September 29, 2002 (age 24); Russia
- Origin: Kazakhstan
- Genres: Experimental, sound collage
- Years active: 2015–2024, 2026-present
- Label: Next Year's Snow
- Member of: Pragmatica Quartet, SimCard StyleGAN

Octa Möbius Sheffner is a Ukrainian experimental artist and music curator who is known for their prolific and eclectic discography.

== Career ==
Sheffner began making music in 2015. They have been noted for their prolific activity, having released hundreds of albums under dozens of aliases. In 2024, they released the eight-hour-long album LUX under the Asleep Country alias, with it acting as their final release and magnum opus. Sheffner has retired from music production in 2024, but returned in 2026, with the project Box of Names serving as a sequel to LUX.

Sheffner also manages the music label Next Year's Snow which hosts numerous experimental projects.

== Musical style ==
Sheffner's discography spans multiple styles of music, but mostly consists of ambient and sound collage pieces, which are noted for their sprawling density and long-form composition.

== Notable works ==
Due to the extensive nature of Sheffner's discography, only notable releases will be listed:

- Untested for Human Consumption (2021, with SimCard StyleGAN)
- Two Arrows Up (2022, with Pragmatica Quartet)
- Radical (2022, with Pragmatica Quartet)
- Logical And with Double Overbar (2022, with Pragmatica Quartet)
- Fake Opulent (2023, as Asleep Country)
- "ÆTHERIST" (2023, with SimCard StyleGAN)
- LUX (2024, as Asleep Country)
- ÆTHERIST III: A Tale of Two Phones (2025, with SimCard StyleGAN)
- Box of Names (2026, as Bloc of Oppositions)

== See also ==
- Bull of Heaven (band)
