= Joyboy =

Caribbean deity

Joyboy is a Caribbean deity, who embodies concepts like joy, revelry, and liberation, and symbolizes dance, music, and celebration.

== Description ==
As a syncretize deity, Joyboy was likely introduced by African slaves sent to the Caribbean. In that capacity, the Caribbean deity personifies the human need to dance, sing, and jubilate, and in Caribbean folk religion, is related to the "Lord of the Dancers", one of the apocryphal titles that was attributed to Jesus Christ.

Joyboy was depicted as cradling a drum with his left arm while holding a drumstick in his right hand. He is described as smiling perpetually at all the problems and hardships of mankind, and cures the troubles by tapping out an irresistible rhythm on his drum. Whoever hears the music of Joyboy is compelled to dance and sing along until he or she has shaken the black cloak of despair from the shoulders.

The legend of Joyboy is one of the many inspirations in Caribbean jazz musicians, such as Julius Eastman.

== References in media ==
In One Piece, Joy Boy was revealed to be the previous user of the Devil Fruit later eaten by Monkey D. Luffy. When Luffy's Devil Fruit awakened after he was knocked unconscious by Kaido, his heartbeat took on the qualities of what the ancient elephant Zunesha called the "Drums of Liberation," prompting Zunesha to declare that Joy Boy had returned.
