= The Vera Project =

Arts organization in Seattle

Coordinates: 47°37′22.9″N 122°21′13.54″W

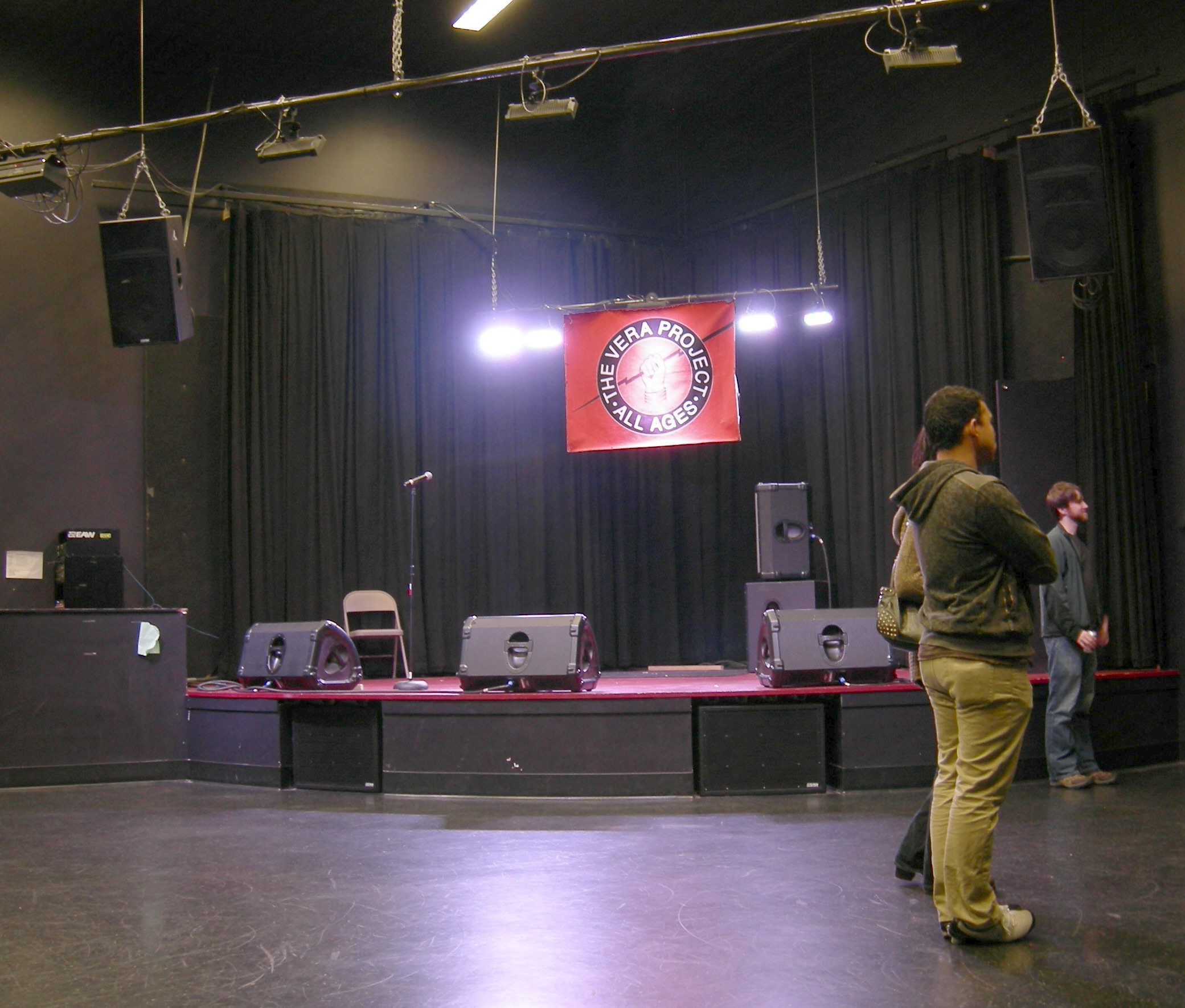
Main stage, The Vera Project (2007)

The Vera Project, or VERA, is an all-ages, non-profit youth arts organization in Seattle, Washington.

== Overview ==
Based on the Vera club in Groningen, Netherlands. The name Vera comes from the phrase Veri Et Recti Amici, which is Latin meaning "true and sincere friends". Seattle's VERA Project was founded in 2001 by James Keblas, Shannon Stewart (both studied at the University of Groningen in 1999), and Kate Becker (founder of the Old Redmond Firehouse), along with the help of many other community organizers and the City of Seattle.

A promotional description of the project is a quote from its own website:

Vera is an all-ages volunteer fueled music and arts venue. By engaging participants at all levels of music production and community organizing, Vera strives to fulfill its mission to foster a participatory creative culture through popular music concerts, arts programs, experiential learning and volunteer opportunities for all ages, especially young people. Vera’s programs are always all ages, with a focus on young people ages 14 to 24. Most Vera programs are at the Seattle Center venue, and include:
- Popular music concerts
- Audio engineering training
- Youth-driven governance
- Visual art exhibits
- Live and studio recording
- Leadership training
- Silkscreen printing/classes
- Event production training
- Internships
These activities are initiated and driven collaboratively by Vera’s volunteers, staff, Board of Directors and youth-led Membership.

== Events ==
The Vera Project's first event was hosted on January 27, 2001 at the IBEW Local 46 and featured local artists The Murder City Devils, Botch and The Blood Brothers. Almost 1,000 people attended including local press and city officials. The Vera Project went on to host several more shows at IBEW Local 46 and then moved on to the Theatre Off Jackson when their lease expired at the IBEW Local 46. The Vera Project hosted shows at the Theatre Off Jackson until they found a longer-lasting home at 1916 4th Ave in 2002 that would be demolished a few years later for new development. The Vera Project hosted shows at various venues in Seattle until their current location, the corner of Warren Ave N. and Republican at the Seattle Center, was finished in 2007. The new Vera is open for business and hosting about two shows a week, along with a variety of other arts and media-related programming.

The Vera Project has hosted many successful local and national music acts including Kaina, Band of Horses, Chairlift, Dan Deacon, The Evens, Fruit Bats, Harvey Danger, Lightning Bolt, Minus the Bear, Murs, No Age, Shellac, The Shins, TV on the Radio, Weezer, WHY?, Quasi, Health, Surfer Blood, The Gossip, Fleet Foxes, Macklemore, Car Seat Headrest, and Titus Andronicus. The Bellevue, Seattle and West Seattle versions of the School of Rock perform shows frequently at this venue.

== See also ==
- Youth voice
- Youth-led media
- ABC No Rio
- 924 Gilman
- Lemp Neighborhood Arts Center
