= Lemp Neighborhood Arts Center =

Arts center in St. Louis, Missouri, U.S.

Coordinates: 38°35′39″N 90°13′07″W

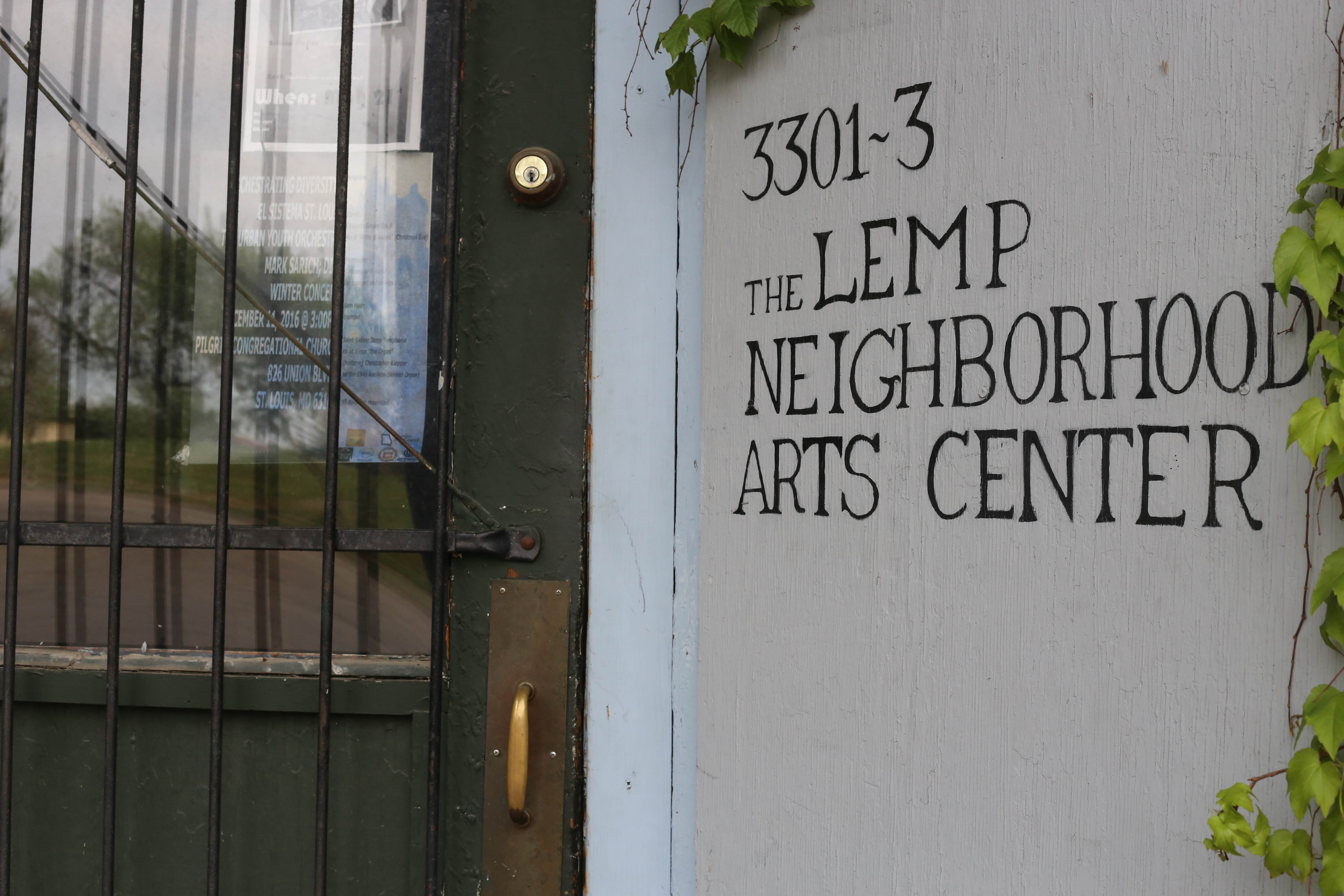
The Lemp Neighborhood Arts Center

The Lemp Neighborhood Arts Center (LNAC), also known as "The Lemp," is a non-profit performance space, art gallery, and community center located in the historic Benton Park neighborhood of St. Louis, Missouri. Since its founding in March 1994, the organization has been among the forefront of art spaces committed to the DIY ethic in St. Louis and the Midwest, holding the position as one of the oldest all-ages "Do-It-Yourself" music venues in the region and in the United States, alongside ABC No Rio in New York City, 924 Gilman Street in Berkeley, California, and the Ché Café in La Jolla, California.

== Music venue ==
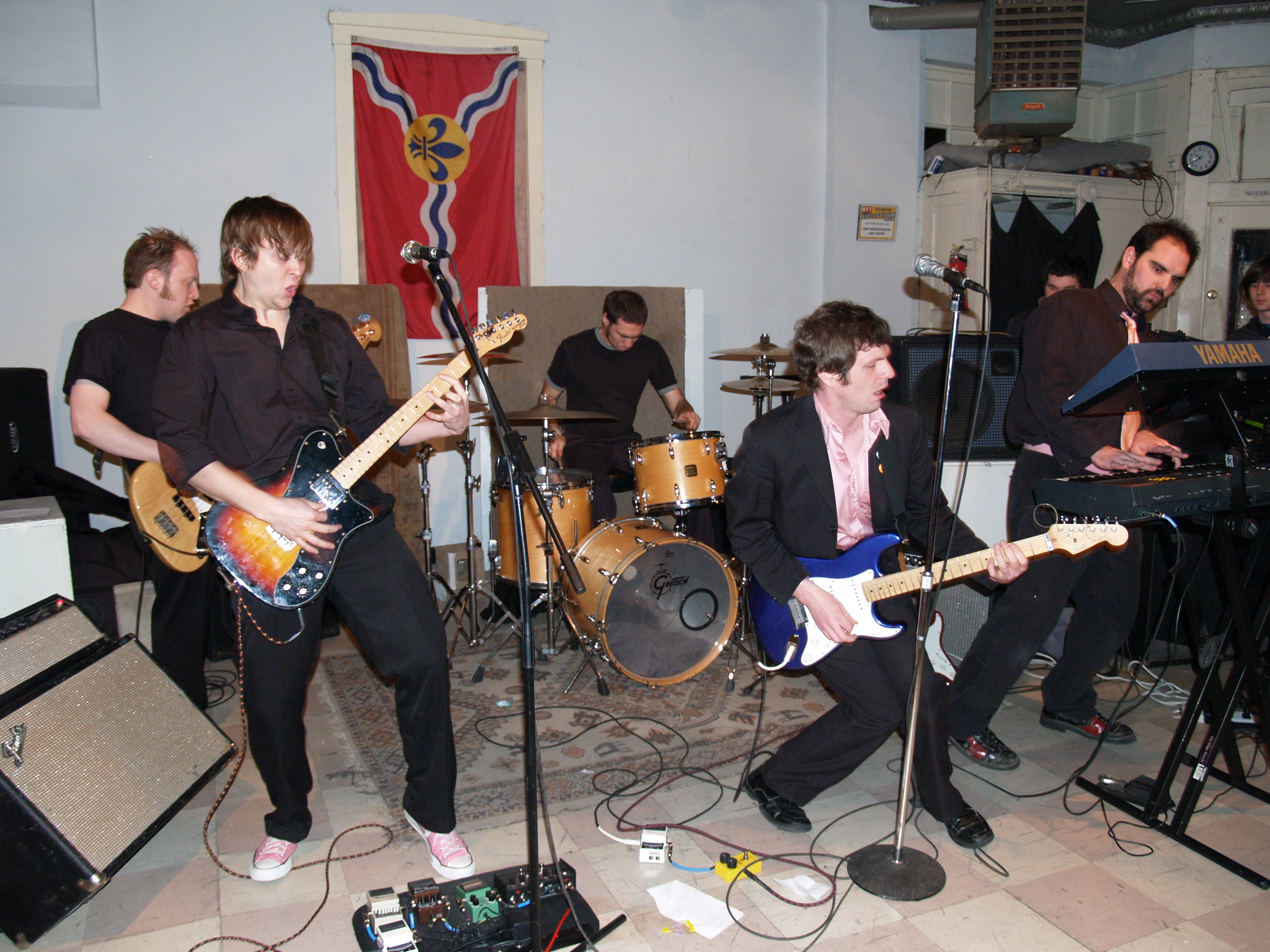
Performance at The Lemp Neighborhood Arts Center

As a non-profit project, the Lemp is known for operating with a DIY ethic of show promotion and venue maintenance, relying on a team of volunteers to help with day-to-day functions. Inspired by the straight edge movement and Fugazi's business ethics, the shows at Lemp are always all-ages, drug and alcohol free, and cost five dollars for admission at the door, with the majority of the money paid to the music performers directly. The venue also strictly avoids booking bands and musicians with a commercialized sound and/or music industry standard of practice, or any performer who promotes "violent or reckless behavior" or "a discriminatory, lewd, degrading or immoral message."

The Lemp has long been known for hosting experimental music acts, most notably ones classifiable as noise rock, art rock, or noise music. Other genres it has known to frequently select include but are not limited to: free improvisation, electro-acoustic, folk, hardcore, punk, post-punk, math rock, indie rock, emo revival, post-hardcore, grindcore, and no wave. Additionally, the Lemp hosts poetry and theater.

In addition to its regular concerts, Lemp is also acclaimed for hosting a three-day festival called NoisefeSTL, which is known for showcasing experimental performers from the Midwest "whose work could be associated with noise." NoisefeSTL inaugurated in October 2004, and has occurred annually until its latest showcase in 2013.

=== Notable acts ===
Notable touring acts who have played at the Lemp over the years include Animal Collective, Mount Eerie, Wolf Eyes, Xiu Xiu, Deerhunter, Julie Doiron, Joe Lally (of Fugazi), Megafaun, This Town Needs Guns (TTNG), Phosphorescent, Yacht, Ariel Pink, Man Man, Casiotone for the Painfully Alone, Parts & Labor, The Rosebuds, tUnE-yArDs, Colleen Green, Liturgy, La Dispute, Hop Along, The World Is a Beautiful Place & I Am No Longer Afraid to Die, An Albatross, Mirah, Piglet, Bullet Train To Vegas, Mischief Brew, Defiance, Ohio, Pit Er Pat, Shoplifting, Frog Eyes, Emperor X, Ad Astra Per Aspera, CAVE, Pomegranates, We vs. The Shark, Ian Svenonius, Joe Jack Talcum, The Low Budgets, Nat Baldwin, Viking Moses, Neptune, Fat Worm of Error, Yukon, Extra Life, Zs, The Flying Luttenbachers, Ahleuchatistas, Upsilon Acrux, Jon Mueller, Bull of Heaven, Caroliner, Yellow Swans, Khanate, Jackie-O Motherfucker, The Body, John Wiese, Sissy Spacek, Panicsville, The Plot to Blow Up the Eiffel Tower, Modern Life is War, Against Me!, Crime in Stereo, Magrudergrind, HeWhoCorrupts, Pissed Jeans, Fear Before the March of Flames, Loma Prieta, We Be The Echo, Arms and Sleepers, Caspian, Tiny Moving Parts, Empire! Empire! (I Was a Lonely Estate), Castevet (CSTVT), Cloakroom, Into It. Over It. and the late Peter Brötzmann, among many others.

The venue has also hosted and/or incubated a great number of local bands and musicians in its history, such as Yowie, Darin Gray (of Dazzling Killmen and Brise-Glace), Grandpa's Ghost, Jack Callahan, So Many Dynamos, Angel Olsen, and the prior bands of the members of Foxing

== Orchestrating Diversity ==
Since 2009, Lemp has operated a program called Orchestrating Diversity, a social change program that provides free education in orchestral music to inner-city youth of Saint Louis. Students participate in an eight-week summer intensive that provides music instruction for eight hours per day, as well as an after-school program throughout the regular school year. They are taught music theory, history and musicianship at a college level. They are also taught to perform symphonic music in a large ensemble known as the Orchestrating Diversity Urban Youth Orchestra, and are given free private instruction on their instruments by professional musicians, college faculty members, and student volunteers from Washington University in St. Louis and Saint Louis University.

In the summer of 2012, Orchestrating Diversity began the Junior Urban Music Program (JUMP), which provides extensive beginners music classes to children aged 5–8 years old. Because of JUMP's success in its inaugural year, it was expanded in the summer of 2013 to provide classes in East Saint Louis, Illinois.

Orchestrating Diversity is a nucleo (music center) of El Sistema USA, which is a network of similar programs in the United States modeled off of El Sistema in Venezuela.

== See also ==
- Fugazi
- 924 Gilman Street
- ABC No Rio
- Ché Café
- Flywheel Arts Collective
- Mr. Roboto Project
- The Smell
- The VERA Project
