= Clayton Counts =

American musical artist (1973–2016)

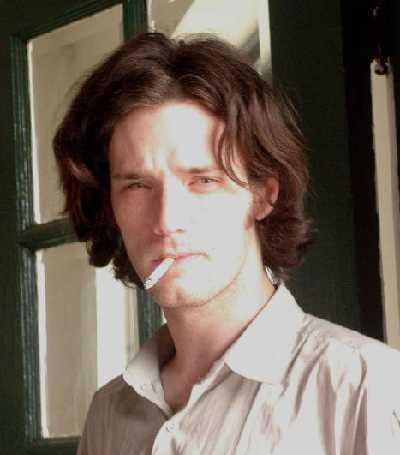

Background information
- Born: August 19, 1973
- Origin: Denver, Colorado
- Died: November 22, 2016 (aged 43)
- Genres: Drone, experimental, sound art, noise, dark ambient, psychedelic rock, progressive rock, post-rock, jazz
- Occupation(s): Musician, composer, DJ, writer
- Instrument(s): Guitar, bass guitar, synthesizers, piano, computer
- Years active: 2006–2016
- Formerly of: Bull of Heaven, The Beachles
- Website: claytoncounts.com

Clayton Counts (August 19, 1973 – November 22, 2016) was an American musician and composer, a former DJ, and one half of the experimental band Bull of Heaven.

== Early life ==
Counts was born with detached retinas in both his eyes. A series of surgeries at a young age complicated this, leaving him blind in his right eye, and weakened in his left. Counts was initially located in Austin, Texas.

In the 1990s, Counts became notorious with his prank phone calls to the Austin Community Access Center, in particular Alex Jones's show. An incident occurred – though with varying claims from both sides – in which Counts was involved in the assault of Jones in a parking lot with three other individuals. As a follow-up, it was claimed that Jones used FBI connections to label Counts a terrorist and claimed he possessed child pornography. Federal agents raided the FringeWare Review bookstore, headquarters of an early cyberculture magazine that Counts wrote articles for. The case was later dropped.

In 2000, Counts relocated to Chicago. While there, he met Neil Keener, who would later join Counts in the band Bull of Heaven.

== DJ work ==
In the 2000s, Counts worked as a DJ to afford a living. He worked at various clubs, including Lava, Whiskey Sky, Reserve, Darkroom, the Allstate Arena, as well as performing at private functions. In July 2005, Counts was again involved in an incident, this time the alleged battery of a bouncer at the Lava club. There are two sides to this story: Counts claims that he was told the set he was playing was "too loud" by club owner Brian Sarpalius (aka Phantom 45), who then subsequently interfered with and eventually unplugged Counts' equipment prior to having him removed by a bouncer. Sarpalius claims that it was actually Counts who caused a scene, and damaged the club's equipment. Counts allegedly discharged a can of mace at the bouncer's feet as a warning shot, though the stories of this differ from both sides. Later in the night, Counts was arrested, and his equipment was lost for several days whilst it was in possession of another club-goer the night of the incident. Counts had been DJing at the Lava club for four years prior to Sarpalius becoming the new owner, and this incident ended his shows there. The charges against Counts were dropped after a lengthy court case.

== Musical career ==
In September 2006, Counts gained notoriety when he created a mash-up of The Beach Boys' Pet Sounds with The Beatles' Sgt. Pepper's Lonely Hearts Club Band, aptly titled Sgt. Petsound's Lonely Hearts Club Band and credited to the band The Beachles. The mash-up album was created in conjunction with the 40th anniversary of Pet Sounds, and was favoured by various sites. This popularity reached EMI, who in turn issued Counts a cease and desist notice, demanded the IP addresses of everyone who downloaded it through his blog, and attempted to sue him for upwards of $30 mil. However, upon deletion of the album, the case was dropped.

In December, Counts' site announced his death, which was later revealed to be a hoax.

In 2008, Counts along with Neil Keener founded the band Bull of Heaven. Their first piece, 001: Weed Problem, was released on January 30, 2008. Since then, the band has released more than 300 numbered pieces, a second set of 100 pieces numbered in Roman numerals, many pieces of notable length, as well as a variety of untitled tracks, sound puzzles, and anti-music. On 21 January 2009, Counts was featured as the cover of the Denver Post's arts section, performing a solo piano composition. In 2012, the band's site suffered some downtime, and has been going through various issues since. In July, they announced that a "Series 2" of music would be coming. In 2013, the band announced that new material was nearing completion, and have since added new pieces to their Facebook page and Internet Archive collection. As of 2014, the band was still releasing music regularly with Counts giving an interview in February to Vice in the Netherlands and the band performing at the Lemp Neighborhood Arts Center in St. Louis.

== Death ==
In November 2016, Clayton died from an overdose of opiates, having accessed them after experiencing ongoing pain due to a car crash the year prior.

== Discography ==
as The Beachles

- Sgt. Petsound's Lonely Hearts Club Band, 2006

as Clayton Counts

- Nisan Moon Phase (Extended), 2008
- Lilliputian Death March, 2008
- Julian Year (Imprecise), 2009

with Bull of Heaven

See Bull of Heaven discography for concise discography of Bull of Heaven.

=== Compilation appearances ===
- Trunculence, 2008
- The Unscratchable Itch: A Tribute To Little Fyodor (with Blood Rhythms), 2013

=== Bootleg/Unauthorized ===
- Miscellaneous Mashups 2004–2009, 2022
