= Bánh Mì Verlag =

American record label

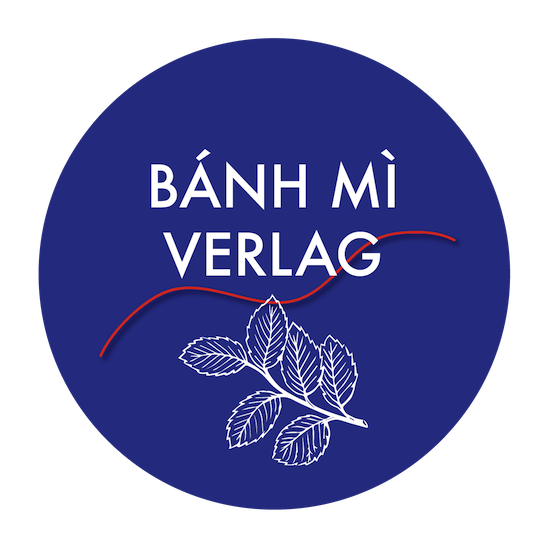
- Founded: 2013
- Founder: Jack Callahan
- Genre: Experimental; Electronic
- Location: Queens, New York, USA
- Official website: banhmiverlag.com

Bánh Mì Verlag is an experimental music record label based in Queens, New York City, USA.

== Artists ==
- Peter Ablinger
- Apsirs Group
- Bookworms
- Dante Boon
- John Carlos Callahan
- Cont Ext
- Ben Davis
- DJ Robot
- die Reihe
- Max Eilbacher
- Ryan Fall & Christopher Moore
- Gene Pick
- David Grubba
- Gvnt Valentine
- Jero Route 66
- Luminous Kudler
- Luke Moldof
- Network Glass
- Michael Pisaro
- Ellen Phan
- Mattin
- Sands Pleine
- Nick James Scavo
- Schwarz69
- Shots
- Skylark Quartet
- sohsie LAN
- Soundwave
- Matthew Sullivan
- Lucie Vítková
- Voice Training
- Jeff Witscher
