= Home Blitz =

American alternative rock band

- Origin: Princeton, New Jersey
- Genres: Garage punk, alternative rock, power pop, lo-fi
- Years active: 2005–
- Labels: Gulcher Records; Richie Records; Mexican Summer
- Members: Daniel DiMaggio; Adrian Rew; Jack Callahan
- Past members: Henry Hynes; Jason Sigal; Theresa Smith; Gerard Allen; Sarim Al-Rawi; Brian Mulvey
- Website: homeblitz.net

Home Blitz is an alternative rock band founded by Daniel DiMaggio in 2005. Based in Princeton, New Jersey, the group is known for its idiosyncratic punk-influenced pop music.

== Musical history ==
Daniel DiMaggio, frontman and songwriter for Home Blitz since 2005, is known for what Pitchfork described as "genre-ambivalent" low-fidelity power pop with eccentricities that "flaunt his oblique streak like a point of pride" and "compel repeated listening."

As of 2011, the band included frontman Daniel DiMaggio, drummer Henry Hynes, bass player Jason Sigal, and guitarist Theresa Smith.

According to the Mexican Summer label, DiMaggio's approach to songwriting changes on each new record, with the result that no two Home Blitz releases sound alike. Common threads include lo-fi recordings featuring DiMaggio's lead vocals, and "the sort of nervous energy that powered groups like the Feelies and Game Theory, two distinct touchpoints in Home Blitz's sloppy, floppy sound."

The 2012 EP Frozen Track includes five original songs by DiMaggio and a "reverent" cover of Game Theory's "Rolling With The Moody Girls."

DiMaggio recorded the 2015 album, Foremost & Fair, in a professional studio, unlike the band's previous material, resulting in clearer vocals and higher fidelity. According to Vice, the album features "a noticeable UK folk influence creeping into the muscular guitar pop DiMaggio has become known for."

Pitchfork wrote that DiMaggio "spikes saccharine melodies with bratty little gestures, rebelling against his own compositional knowhow." The reviewer described DiMaggio's breathy and "unapologetically affected" vocals, layered over a mix "saturated with shimmery tones: teeming harpsichord, zippy keyboard, sunburst acoustic guitar picking."

== Discography ==
=== Albums ===
Title	Year	Format	Label
Home Blitz	2007	CD (compilation)	Gulcher Records
Out of Phase	2009	LP, CD	Richie Records
Foremost & Fair	2015	LP	Richie Records

=== Singles and EPs ===
Title	Year	Format	Label
Home Blitz	2005	7-inch EP	self-released
Live Outside	2006	7-inch EP	self-released
Weird Wings	2008	12-inch EP	Parts Unknown Records
Perpetual Night	2010	7-inch EP	Almost Ready Records
"A.T.K." b/w "Last Cycle"	2011	7-inch single	Mexican Summer
Frozen Track	2012	12-inch EP	Mexican Summer
