= Mary Jane Leach =

American composer based in New York City (born 1949)

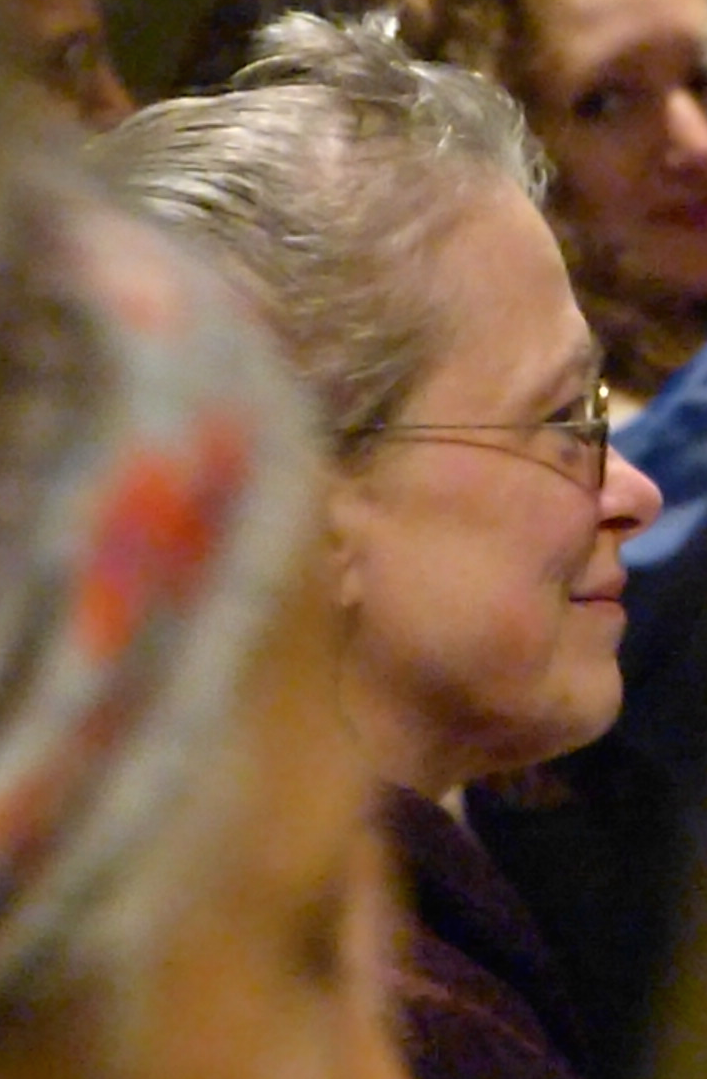
- Leach in 2015

Background information
- Born: 1949 (age 76–77); Vermont, United States
- Occupation: Composer
- Labels: Experimental Intermedia; New World; Blume; Modern Love
- Website: www.mjleach.com

Mary Jane Leach (born 1949) is an American composer based in New York City. She has been a member of the Downtown Ensemble, composer in residence at Sankt Peter, Köln, and has recordings on XI, New World Records, and Lovely Music. In the late 1970s Leach composed mainly with tape, overdubbing her own playing and singing. As her music became more frequently performed she continued writing in an "overdubbing" fashion, layering parts and experimenting with the textures created by multiple voices. Her compositional style is characterized by modality, imitation, and prolongation. Leach received a 1995 Foundation for Contemporary Arts Grants to Artists Award. She currently teaches music courses at Rensselaer Polytechnic Institute.

Leach is also the primary archivist and bibliographer of composer Julius Eastman. She met Eastman in 1981. In the late 1990s, she realized his music had been lost and set about collecting scores and recordings. With Renée Levine Packer, Leach edited Gay Guerrilla: Julius Eastman and His Music, the premiere book on Eastman's life and work.

== Works ==
- Piano Concerto for Emanuele, 2010
- Piano E-Tude for Piano, Singer and Piano on Tape, 2009
- Four Play for four Violins, 1986/2007
- Labyrinthus for mixed Chorus and String Quartet, 2007
- Bach's Set for Solo Cello and eight Celli on tape, 2007
- Notes Passing Notes for two Female singers live und two Female singers on tape, 2007
- Gulf War Syndrome for Piano, Clarinet, Cello, Percussion and Tape or Synthesizer and Tape or Piano, Synthesizer, Clarinet, 2-4 Instruments and Tape, 2004, 2006
- Wolff Tones E-Tude for Piano and 4-6 Instruments, 2004
- Dido in a Minute for Synthesizer and Tape, 2003
- The Crane Dance for Soprano and eight part Female Chorus, 2002
- Dido Remembered for Synthesizer and Tape, 2002
- Copralalia, la la la for two sopranos and tape, 2002
- Bruckstück for eight or six part Female chorus, 1989, 2002
- The Great Goddess for eight part Female Chorus, 2001
- Glorious Ariadne for eight part Female Chorus, 2001
- By'm Bye for Piano, 2001
- Hear My Voice for Soprano, eight part Female Chorus and String Quartet, 2001
- I Sing of Warfare for Tenor, Male Chorus and String Quartet, 2001
- Night Blossoms for Vocal quartet a cappella, 2001
- Theseus Arrives for mixed chorus and String Quartet, 2000
- Minos for Tenor and mixed chorus, 1999
- The Sacred Dance for Soprano and String Quartet, 1999
- Call to the Ceremony for mixed chorus and String Quartet, 1999
- Ceremony of the Bull for mixed chorus and String Quartet, 1998
- First String for String Quartet, 1998
- O Magna Vasti Creta for eight part female chorus and String Quartet, 1997
- Call of the Dance for Soprano and eight part female chorus, 1997
- Ariadne's Lament for eight part female chorus or Trombone Choir, 1993, 1996
- Ariel's Song for eight part female chorus or Trombone Choir, 1987, 1996
- Song of Sorrows for mixed Chorus, 1995
- Windjammer for Oboe, Clarinet and Bassoon, 1995
- Tricky Pan for Solo Countertenor and eight Countertenors on tape, 1995
- Corrina Ocarina for Flute und Harp, 1994
- Xantippe's Rebuke for Solo Oboe and eight Oboes on tape, 1993
- He Got Dictators for Soprano, Piano and Bass, 1993
- Feu de Joie for Solo Bassoon and six Bassoons on Tape, 1992

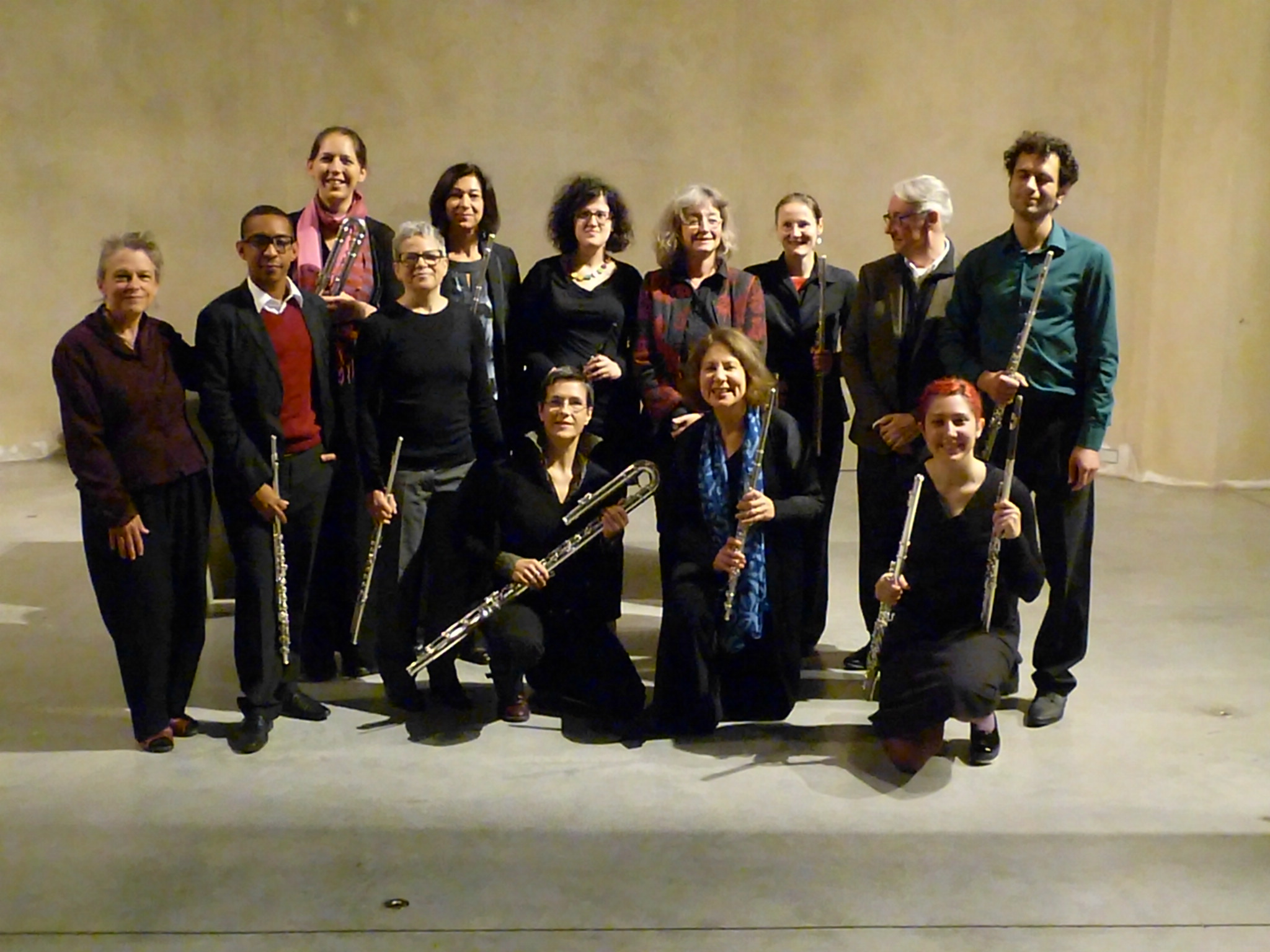
Mary Jane Leach (on the left) 2015 at „Cologne Music Night“ (with Camilla Hoitenga (fl), The Flute Projekt and college Kevin Volans (backrow 2. from right) (Photo by Annamarie Ursula)

- Kirchtraum, Hörspielmusik, 1992
- Bare Bones for four Trombones, 1989
- Pipe Dreams for Organ, 1989
- Sephardic Fragments for Soprano, 1989
- Mountain Echoes for eight part female chorus, 1987
- Guy de Polka for Accordion, 1987
- Ariel's Song for eight part female chorus, 1987
- Green Mountain Madrigal for eight part female chorus, 1985
- 8 x 4 for Alto flute, Clarinet, English horn und Singer, 1985
- Trio for Duo for Alto flute and Singer, 1985
- 4BC for four Bass clarinets, 1984
- Held Held for Alto flute and singer, 1984
- Note Passing Note for Solo Female Singer and Female Singer on tape, 1981
