= Bull of Heaven (band) =

American experimental music group

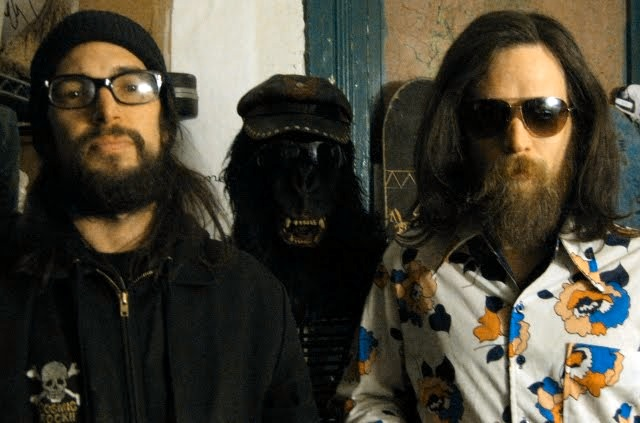
- Neil Keener (left) and Clayton Counts (right) in 2014

Background information
- Origin: Denver, Colorado, U.S.
- Genres: Ambient; drone; experimental; industrial; polystylism; post-rock; stoner rock
- Works: Discography
- Years active: 2008–2016; 2018–present
- Label: Independent
- Members: Neil Keener
- Past members: Clayton Counts
- Website: bullofheaven.com

Bull of Heaven is an American experimental music project formed in Denver, Colorado in 2008. The project originally consisted of Neil Keener and Clayton Counts with help from various contributors. Since Counts' death in 2016, Keener has been the only member.

Bull of Heaven is mainly known for their extremely and exaggeratedly long pieces of music, mainly produced by Counts, with several pieces in their discography ranging from milliseconds to many millions of years long.

== History ==
=== Formation: 2006–2009 ===
Bull of Heaven's first release, "Weed Problem"

Both key members behind Bull of Heaven started with a variety of earlier projects. Neil Keener was (and in some cases, still is) involved with several punk rock and post-hardcore bands, including Planes Mistaken for Stars, Git Some, Red Cloud West, and Wovenhand. Clayton Counts was also involved in Git Some, before he and Neil moved from Chicago to Denver, where Bull of Heaven was founded. Counts also gained notoriety in September 2006 when he created a mash-up of The Beach Boys' Pet Sounds with The Beatles' Sgt. Pepper's Lonely Hearts Club Band, aptly titled Sgt. Petsound's Lonely Hearts Club Band and credited to the band The Beachles. Various blogs and news sites favoured it; however, Counts was issued with a cease and desist.

Bull of Heaven's first piece, 001: Weed Problem, was released on their site on January 31, 2008. The same time the following year, the band had already released more than fifty pieces, totalling nearly three hundred hours of music. Even at this early stage in the band's history, they were already becoming known for their incredible song lengths; 012: Timeship 2012 is 3 hours long, 019: Hypnosis, Drugs, and Mind Control (The Beginning: A Touch) is eight hours long, 028: Even to the Edge of Doom is twenty-four hours long, 044: A Corpse in My Arms on Awakening breaks the one-day mark at thirty-seven hours long, but is surpassed by 045: The Wicked Cease From Struggling which is exactly one week long.

=== 2009–2010 ===
Between April and May 2009, the band intermittently released a series of one hundred new songs, all named and numbered in Roman numerals. These pieces were most likely tests to see what they could do with their songs. Pieces I – C were the first of several breaks from the band's standard three-digit numbering system of releasing music.

From September 2009 to January of the following year, the band also started releasing another new series, known as Alephs. The first ten of these contained roughly 1000–1100 pieces in each sub-folder. Aleph10 and Aleph11 contain one million and ten million pieces respectively. Though Aleph10 had all one million files, Aleph11 only has ~1640000.

The band gained acknowledgement in December 2009 in underground music communities when they released 118: The Chosen Priest and Apostle of Infinite Space, a piece that is over two months long.

In January 2010, Clayton Counts talked to The Fly about long players, discussing the various musicians that also delved into extremely long lengths of music, such as John Cage, Robert Rich, and even Wagner's Der Ring des Nibelungen. With this, the band continued creating pieces of equally extreme lengths; pieces 145–152 all range from 50 to 140 hours each, known to fans as the "multiday series."

In June 2010, the band created another new set of pieces different from the numbered, Aleph, and I – C pieces; this was a set of ten untitled folders, each containing thousands of short pieces, named as 32 digits of hexadecimal code. These pieces were not made public, and were only posted in the band's media sub-directory of their website.

In July 2010, the band released three very long pieces, the third of which gained them notoriety online, mainly in communities and discussion boards focused around finding the longest piece of music ever made. 208: As You Etch on the Inner Window of Your Eye is over 38 days long, 209: Blurred with Tears and Suffering Beyond Hope is over 6 months long, but both are beaten by 210: Like a Wall in Which an Insect Lives and Gnaws, a piece that would have lasted exactly 50,000 hours, or over five years, but due to errors uploading, the piece has become partially lost..

=== 2010–2013 ===
Between the end of 2010 and 2011, the band started Era 3 (201-300) creating pieces that were not posted on the website and very anti-music releases. These include pieces with negative lengths, puzzles that, when solved, grant access to new songs, password-protected polyglot files, pieces embedded within other formats such as PDF and EXE, programs without any music, corrupted files, and infinitely looping SWF files.

In March 2011, the band released a series of pieces of extraordinary lengths known as the LCM series. This series, ranging from their numerical ordering of 238–260, is similar to the Longplayer idea – each sound is the length of a prime number, and each subsequent piece creates near-infinite lengths of time before they're synchronized. The final in the series, 260: lcm(2,3,5,7,11,13,17,19,23,29,31,37,41,43,47,53,59,61,67,71,73,79,83), would last over 8 septillion years before all the pieces synchronized.

In December 2011, three more extremely long pieces of music were released by the band: 285: A Violet Breath, 286: 0, and 287: n. These pieces only consisted of short sounds being repeated for the entire duration. 285 was over 13 months, 286 was over 3,000 years, and 287 was over 10 billion years long.

During 2012, the band only released three pieces of music: 288: Four Years Ago? Opium., an experimental hip-hop-adjacent track; 289: CALCULOR, a calculator that doubles as a music generator; and 290: Two-Legged Tigers and Crocodiles, a sound collage piece. In July, the band's site had many downages and 404 errors, leading to it eventually crashing completely. After a few months, however, the site returned and functionality resumed for the most part.

The band took a long hiatus until July 2013, at which time they released several hours of psychedelic rock. It was announced via their Facebook page that more new music would be made available within the year. In September they released a number of drone and post-rock tracks, and in November 299: Self-Traitor, I Do Bring the Spider Love, an hour-and-twenty-minute-long jazz fusion arrangement. By the end of 2013, the band had uploaded most of their music to a public domain Internet Archive collection, where all of their newer works reside as they continued to program a new website.

=== 2014–present ===
In early 2014, the band released a fan-made compilation of love songs, 300: Songs for Girls, followed by 301: Weed Problem II–V, and another extremely lengthy piece, 302: It is Part of Space and Time, which runs for at least 86 billion years. Clayton Counts was interviewed by Vice in the Netherlands, discussing a range of topics related to the band and their sonic approach.

On April 24, 2014, psychedelic rock band The Flaming Lips included a reference to Bull of Heaven in the liner notes of the vinyl release of the condensed version of their 24 hour long piece 7 Skies H3. The Flaming Lips mistakenly call the band "Bull in Heaven," but refer to their pieces 118: The Chosen Priest and Apostle of Infinite Space and 210: Like a Wall in Which an Insect Lives and Gnaws specifically.

On July 10, 2014, the band released 305: Hostages are Human Beings. On July 12, 2014, 303: n(k), 304: 0(2^18x5^18) and 306: It is Not a Lack of Love were released, with the first two being over nine billion years and over three septillion years long respectively, although 306 is only 10 minutes and 51 seconds long. On the very next day, they released several other tracks of various lengths. As of today, 310: ΩΣPx0(2^18×5^18)p*k*k*k is their longest release, and lasts for 3.343 quindecillion years.

In May 2016, Bull of Heaven were discussed in Wesley Cray's essay "Unperformable Works and the Ontology of Music", written for Grand Valley State University and published in the British Journal of Aesthetics.

On October 17, 2016, Bull of Heaven released their final numbered release, 353: To Fill the Mouth of Their Monster, although pieces 334 onward never made it onto their website.

On December 4, 2016, Bull of Heaven made a post on their Facebook page announcing the death of member Clayton Counts.

After Clayton Counts' death, Bull of Heaven remained inactive, however on September 12, 2018, Neil Keener released the first new Bull of Heaven piece since Counts' death, titled "Fight Night for the Ghosts of Heaven". Neil has continued to make releases under the Bull of Heaven moniker, focusing on musical styles akin to progressive electronic and post-rock.

== Musical style ==
Bull of Heaven is mostly known for its slow, lengthy, unchanging music. Usually the focus is around dark ambient, minimalism, and drone; however, the band is not limited to just these genres and is a polystylistic act that has made several works in various other different styles. Pieces in their discography have been categorized as soundscapes, found sound, spoken word, post-rock, harsh noise, contemporary classical music, ambient americana, drone doom, avant-garde jazz and electronica.

== Live performances ==
Bull of Heaven has only performed a handful of live shows, notably at a party held by the Japanese band Boris in Denver in 2010, and at the Lemp Neighborhood Arts Center in St. Louis in 2014.

== Discography ==
Bull of Heaven have hundreds of releases in their discography. Before Counts' death in 2016, they mainly focused on a progressively numbered series of works. In 2013, they put out the non-numbered Latin series, which consisted of drone/noise pieces mingled with numerous jam sessions with multiple musicians, notably which many were used and stitched together in the 83-minute psych rock track 299: Self-Traitor, I Do Bring The Spider Love. In 2018, Keener resumed the Bull of Heaven project and abandoned the conventional numbered system.

=== Numbered releases (2008–2016) ===
- 001: Weed Problem (2008)
- 002: He Is Not Dead, but Sleepeth (2008)
- 003: Eleven Floors Down (2008)
- 004: Reasoning in State Hospital (2008)
- 005: A Lovely Pear (2008)
- 006: The Myth of Dinosaurs (2008)
- 007: Reptilian Takeover (2008)
- 008: A Wall Between Two Gardens (2008)
- 009: First Our Pleasures Die (2008)
- 010: A White Surveillance Van (2008)
- 011: Spacewalking Your New Way Home (2008)
- 012: Timeship 2012 (2008)
- 013: Elsa, Are You in There? (2008)
- 014: Upon One Pair of English Legs (2008)
- 015: Sun Ritual (2008)
- 016: Get Tree Body (Brainwash Solution) (2008)
- 017: Its Bones Are Soft (2008)
- 018: Candles Green, Heads and Skulls (2008)
- 019: Hypnosis, Drugs, and Mind Control (The Beginning: A Touch) (2008)
- 020: Legend of Degree (2008)
- 021: A Series of Elaborate Precautions (2008)
- 022: Man-Lizards, Masters of Venus (2008)
- 023: Odd Things, Brick Buildings (2008)
- 024: Some Vast Unknown (2008)
- 025: Tale of an Earth Man (2008)
- 026: A Curious Picture You See With Your Eyes Closed (2008)
- 027: Spirits Clad in Veils (2008)
- 028: Even to the Edge of Doom (2008)
- 029: Lions on a Banner (2008)
- 030: In That Shadow Lurks a Smile (2008)
- 031: Babylonian Mathematics (2008)
- 032: There Is Nothing Hidden That Will Not Be Revealed Pt. 1 (2008)
- 033: There Is Nothing Hidden That Will Not Be Revealed Pt. 2 (2008)
- 034: There Is Nothing Hidden That Will Not Be Revealed Pt. 3 (2008)
- 035: There Is Nothing Hidden That Will Not Be Revealed Pt. 4 (2008)
- 036: As Two From Ten Thousand Pt. 1 (2008)
- 037: As Two From Ten Thousand Pt. 2 (2008)
- 038: A Foot in Place of a Foot (2008)
- 039: Become Smaller and Smaller (2008)
- 040: A Beautiful Dog (2008)
- 041: By What Eternal Streams (2008)
- 042: Pre-Human Spawn of Cthulhu (2008)
- 043: He Is Cruel and Moves With Great Cunning (2008)
- 044: A Corpse in My Arms on Awakening (2008)
- 045: The Wicked Cease From Struggling (2008)
- 046: In All Creatures Are Lust and Hunger (2008)
- 047: At One With Their Antagonists (2008)
- 048: Foreign Ideas, Alien Philosophies (2008)
- 049: The Abyss of the Human Species (2008)
- 050: Far From the Black Ocean (2008)
- 051: Our Light Is a Voice (2008)
- 052: Without Hope, a Mute Offender (2008)
- 053: La tristesse durera toujours (2008)
- 054: Guns, Girls, Psychoactive Drugs (Birth and Redeath) (2009)
- 055: A Killer's Apology Rebuffed (The Destroyer) (2009)
- 056: Return of Ghost Sheriff (Werewolves Are Chasing Me) (2009)
- 057: Narcolepsy: An Introduction (2009)
- 058: Narcolepsy: Dreamtime Collapsing (2009)
- 059: Narcolepsy: Four Thousand BC (2009)
- 060: Narcolepsy: Melting (2009)
- 061: Inflame Thyself in Praying Pt. 1 (2009)
- 062: Inflame Thyself in Praying Pt. 2 (2009)
- 063: Inflame Thyself in Praying Pt. 3 (2009)
- 064: Inflame Thyself in Praying Pt. 4 (2009)
- 065: Inflame Thyself in Praying Pt. 5 (2009)
- 066: Inflame Thyself in Praying Pt. 6 (2009)
- 067: Inflame Thyself in Praying Pt. 7 (2009)
- 068: Inflame Thyself in Praying Pt. 8 (2009)
- 069: Inflame Thyself in Praying Pt. 9 (2009)
- 070: Inflame Thyself in Praying Pt. 10 (2009)
- 071: Inflame Thyself in Praying Pt. 11 (2009)
- 072: Inflame Thyself in Praying Pt. 12 (2009)
- 073: Inflame Thyself in Praying Pt. 13 (2009)
- 074: He Dwells on the Shores of the Sea Pt. 1 (2009)
- 075: He Dwells on the Shores of the Sea Pt. 2 (2009)
- 076: Mysterious Signals From Glowing Orbs (2009)
- 077: The End of the World Must Be Coming (2009)
- 078: Objective Contempt, Objective Conscience (2009)
- 079: Praise to Our Common-Father-Endlessness (2009)
- 080: Your Way and Your Face Are Stainless (2009)
- 081: You Took Dead Bones and You Covered Them With Bodies (2009)
- 082: His Tail Dragged a Third of the Stars of Heaven (2009)
- 083: A Great Fire-Red Dragon With Seven Heads and Ten Horns (2009)
- 084: The Marchers With Left Leg Extended (2009)
- 085: Die, Patriarch! The Screams of Infancy (2009)
- 086: The Longest Distance Between Two Places (2009)
- 087: A Half-Grown Boy in Sea Clothes (2009)
- 088: Death With Every Step (2009)
- 089: Death Had Taken Them, One by One (2009)
- 090: Death in Our Pockets (2009)
- 091: Up to the Rim of the Hollow (2009)
- 092: The Long Count (2009)
- 093: They Found Her Footprints There (2009)
- 094: In Human Form This Fiend to Slay (2009)
- 095: Unity Exists in the Categories (2009)
- 096: This Is the Primal Identity (2009)
- 097: A Perspective, Not the Truth (2009)
- 098: The Final Mystery Is Oneself (2009)
- 099: Quetzalcoatl and the Ancient Astronauts (2009)
- 100: The Thought That Counts (2009)
- 101: Like the First Pine Cone (2009)
- 102: Criminals, Fair and True (2009)
- 103: Her Name Is Unending (2009)
- 104: You Are the Poltergeist (2009)
- 105: I'm Not Here Anymore (2009)
- 106: Let's Murder the Neighbors (2009)
- 107: Axiom of Choice (2009)
- 108: Did You Know That the Bible Have the Answers? (2009)
- 109: Boxes of Scorpions Released by Tripwire (2009)
- 110: Superstring Theory Refuted (2009)
- 111: Superstring Theory Verified (2009)
- 112: Conquer! That Is Enough (2009)
- 113: The Light Higher Than Eyesight (2009)
- 114: Come Forth, O Children, Under the Stars (2009)
- 115: Swift as a Trodden Serpent Turn and Strike! (2009)
- 116: Rituals of the Elements and Feasts of the Times (2009)
- 117: Change Not as Much as the Style of a Letter (2009)
- 118: The Chosen Priest and Apostle of Infinite Space (2009)
- 119: Slippery Buttons, Live in the Upper World, 2003 (2009)
- 120: Everywhere Is Violence (The Machine Is Killing the Babies) (2009)
- 121: O Nobly-Born, They Are Not Really Precipices (2009)
- 122: Drums and Thigh-Bone Trumpets, Skull-Timbrels (2009)
- 123: Eighty Thousand Species of Mischievous Sprites (2009)
- 124: Be Not Daunted Thereby, Nor Terrified, Nor Awed (2009)
- 125: The City Freezing (2009)
- 126: The White Ivy (2009)
- 127: We Seem to Share Your Distress (2010)
- 128: Approaching Them in the Darkness (2010)
- 129: Between Them and Us Stands Our Fear (2010)
- 130: A Slow and Painful Execution (2010)
- 131: Loaded With Buckshot (2010)
- 132: What Filthy Rotten Blood (2010)
- 133: On Wednesday Morning, When the Truck Rolls In (2010)
- 134: Lingering Under the Remainder of Her Disease (2010)
- 135: Under This Umbrella of Satanism (2010)
- 136: The Use of Obsessive Defenses (2010)
- 137: The Meaning of Hysterical Symptoms (2010)
- 138: You Feel a Stillness All Around You, Caressing Your Face (2010)
- 139: My Doctor Gave Me Some (2010)
- 140: And Never Will (2010)
- 141: Creation of Strange Matter (2010)
- 142: Qualia and the Dynamic Core (2010)
- 143: The Hollow Booming of Pieces of Ordnance (2010)
- 144: Poured Onto That Marble Slab (2010)
- 145: Note Notes, Forsooth, and Nothing! (2010)
- 146: Vicious, Cruel, Incapable of Remorse (2010)
- 147: The Most Merciful Thing That a Family Does (2010)
- 148: And Madly Hangs the Grass With Silver Rags (2010)
- 149: Still in My Thought That Lovely Image Breathes (2010)
- 150: With Bare Feet I Trod Upon Thorns and Flints (2010)
- 151: Pleasure Alone Lends Value to Existence (2010)
- 152: The Last Example of These Unclean Horrors (2010)
- 153: The Branch of Gold Consecrated to the Subterranean Goddess (2010)
- 154: In the Form of the Question Concerning the Thingness of Things (2010)
- 155: They Sacrificed Their Sons and Their Daughters Unto Devils (2010)
- 156: Crime and Infamy Have a Right of Asylum Here (2010)
- 157: Fairer Yet Through Sorrow and Separation (2010)
- 158: Prosperity Is Here. Stay With Us, Angel! (2010)
- 159: White as the Petals of Some Water Flower (2010)
- 160: Your Best Loved and Always Known Must Leave (2010)
- 161: Her Song Trembling the Twigs and Small Branches (2010)
- 162: In Their Terror Capable of Anything Pt. 1 (2010)
- 163: In Their Terror Capable of Anything Pt. 2 (2010)
- 164: Regrets Take the Place of Dreams (2010)
- 165: Out of the Nothing Beyond the Lake (2010)
- 166: When the World Is Puddle-Wonderful (2010)
- 167: Isolated Regions of the Human Soul (2010)
- 168: Go With Fiends in That Everlasting Fire (2010)
- 169: Alas! Thy Foul Will Hath Wrought My Woe (2010)
- 170: Low Is the Covering, Unhigh the Sidewalls (2010)
- 171: Buried in a Deep Pit, in a Doorless House (2010)
- 172: Thus Are These Children Filled With Torment (2010)
- 173: Sharp She Was and Keen, and Pleased the Devil (2010)
- 174: It Was Not Known to Thee More Than to Thy Kin (2010)
- 175: Thou Lovedst the Traitors That Were Hateful to God (2010)
- 176: Well Away! And Woe Is Me! That I Ever Came to Thee (2010)
- 177: Then Is That Wretched Life Ended All With Sad Departure (2010)
- 178: For the Devil Taught Thee All, Chief Full Nigh Thy Heart (2010)
- 179: Worms Have Shared Them, Gnawed Their Miserable Bones (2010)
- 180: Now Is Thy Mouth Prevented, for Death Has Closed It (2010)
- 181: All Rueful Is Thy Lot, After Thy Wicked Life (2010)
- 182: When Death, With His Dart, Pineth the Body (2010)
- 183: Victim Accursed, Extend Thy Throat for My Knives (2010)
- 184: Mayst Thou Fall by the Fires of the Heavenly Avenger (2010)
- 185: Submission to Leaders, Hostility to Outsiders (2010)
- 186: A Donkey's Head Sold for Eighty Shekels of Silver (2010)
- 187: Never Mind the Fallibility of All the Human Beings (2010)
- 188: Showering the Rank, Furry Body All Over the Tent (2010)
- 189: From the Threshing Floor? From the Winepress? (2010)
- 190: Our Preferences Do Not Determine What's True (2010)
- 191: With a Sudden Jerk and Involuntary Gesture (2010)
- 192: May God Deal With Me, Be It Ever So Severely (2010)
- 193: Look Death in the Eye and Be Grateful (2010)
- 194: Give Up Your Son So We May Eat Him (2010)
- 195: We Know Who Speaks for the Nations (2010)
- 196: Incoherently Babbling Self-Accusations (2010)
- 197: When the Messenger Comes, Shut the Door (2010)
- 198: A Faint Sensation of a Distant Memory (2010)
- 199: Ere I Forget, or Die, or Move Away (2010)
- 200: So We Cooked My Son and Ate Him (2010)
- 201: How Strangely Still the Water Is Today (2010)
- 202: The Things That Hide in You Come Out Again (2010)
- 203: Like Vast Serpents Infold Around My Limbs (2010)
- 204: For Idle Dreams of Things Which Cannot Be (2010)
- 205: Of What Far Sea Upon What Unknown Ground (2010)
- 206: Like Waters Flowing in the River's Course (2010)
- 207: I Watched You Enter Your Home From Inside a Dumpster (2010)
- 208: As You Etch on the Inner Window of Your Eye (2010)
- 209: Blurred With Tears and Suffering Beyond Hope (2010)
- 210: Like a Wall in Which an Insect Lives and Gnaws (2010)
- 211: With Muffled Sound Obliterating Everything (2010)
- 212: You Went to Meet the Shell's Embrace of Fire (2010)
- 213: Studying the Building From the Changing Angle (2010)
- 214: Modern Man Is Helpless When Confronted With Death (2010)
- 215: And the Bones and the Sinews Were Polished by the Wear (2010)
- 216: Peripatetics and Epicureans Held Very Varying Views (2010)
- 217: The Mongols Were Pagan, Neither Moslem Nor Christian (2010)
- 218: Apparent Uncertainty Among National Security Experts (2010)
- 219: Swift Glances of Caution at the Hurrying Pedestrians (2010)
- 220: Advantages of Making Regular Use of Cleansing Products (2010)
- 221: The Usual Manifestations of Suspicion Were Heightened (2010)
- 222: What Strikes the Oyster Shell Does Not Damage the Pearl (2010)
- 223: There Is More Passing in Their Minds Than We Are Aware Of (2011)
- 224: A Strife of Interests Masquerading as a Contest of Principles (2011)
- 225: When Hostilities Shall Cease on the Part of the Aggressors (2011)
- 226: Stationary If All Statistics Are Invariant Under a Shift in Time (2011)
- 227: Szeretlek, Te Mocskos Kis Kurva! (2011)
- 228: Above the Poor Neglected Graves (2011)
- 229: I Brought a Heart Into the Room (2011)
- 230: From the Garden of the Sun (2011)
- 231: Three Hundred Winters (2011)
- 232: At the Tide's Edge, I Lie (2011)
- 233: Plucked for the Breast of the Dead (2011)
- 234: And I Talk to Them in My Secret Mind (2011)
- 235: In the Conscious Sea, Roused and Prolonged (2011)
- 236: Pitiless Light Over the Stony Landscape (2011)
- 237: Disordered Before the Naked Picture of Despair (2011)
- 238: 2 (2011)
- 239: lcm(2,3) (2011)
- 240: lcm(2,3,5) (2011)
- 241: lcm(2,3,5,7) (2011)
- 242: lcm(2,3,5,7,11) (2011)
- 243: lcm(2,3,5,7,11,13) (2011)
- 244: lcm(2,3,5,7,11,13,17) (2011)
- 245: lcm(2,3,5,7,11,13,17,19) (2011)
- 246: lcm(2,3,5,7,11,13,17,19,23) (2011)
- 247: lcm(2,3,5,7,11,13,17,19,23,29) (2011)
- 248: lcm(2,3,5,7,11,13,17,19,23,29,31) (2011)
- 249: lcm(2,3,5,7,11,13,17,19,23,29,31,37) (2011)
- 250: lcm(2,3,5,7,11,13,17,19,23,29,31,37,41) (2011)
- 251: lcm(2,3,5,7,11,13,17,19,23,29,31,37,41,43) (2011)
- 252: lcm(2,3,5,7,11,13,17,19,23,29,31,37,41,43,47) (2011)
- 253: lcm(2,3,5,7,11,13,17,19,23,29,31,37,41,43,47,53) (2011)
- 254: lcm(2,3,5,7,11,13,17,19,23,29,31,37,41,43,47,53,59) (2011)
- 255: lcm(2,3,5,7,11,13,17,19,23,29,31,37,41,43,47,53,59,61) (2011)
- 256: lcm(2,3,5,7,11,13,17,19,23,29,31,37,41,43,47,53,59,61,67) (2011)
- 257: lcm(2,3,5,7,11,13,17,19,23,29,31,37,41,43,47,53,59,61,67,71) (2011)
- 258: lcm(2,3,5,7,11,13,17,19,23,29,31,37,41,43,47,53,59,61,67,71,73) (2011)
- 259: lcm(2,3,5,7,11,13,17,19,23,29,31,37,41,43,47,53,59,61,67,71,73,79) (2011)
- 260: lcm(2,3,5,7,11,13,17,19,23,29,31,37,41,43,47,53,59,61,67,71,73,79,83) (2011)
- 261: A Feeling for the Order Lying Behind the Appearance (2011)
- 262: The Insistence on Small Miracles (2011)
- 263: Internet Handle for a Thirteen Year Old Girl (2011)
- 264: The Sun Itself Sees Not Till Heaven Clears (2011)
- 265: Interpret the World According to Certain Patterns (2011)
- 266: An Incestuous Act That God Committed Upon Reality (2011)
- 267: We Shall Draw From the Heart of Suffering (2011)
- 268: Persist Without Solace, Without Illusion (2011)
- 269: Have the Gates of Death Been Opened Unto Thee? (2011)
- 270: Hast Thou Seen the Doors of the Shadow of Death? (2011)
- 271: An Itemized Account of the American Failure (2011)
- 272: O Pleasing Death Come With Your Terrible Hands (2011)
- 273: Whispering to Myself Delicious, Terrible Things (2011)
- 274: Their Cow Calveth, and Casteth Not Her Calf (2011)
- 275: The Snow and the Little Wood Under the Blue Sky (2011)
- 276: In My Old Griefs, and With My Childhood's Faith (2011)
- 277: The Nerve Center of Wisdom and the Knower (2011)
- 278: Because of the Emptiness of the Heart (2011)
- 279: Full of Craters and Frozen Lights (2011)
- 280: You Were Shown a Diagram (2011)
- 281: Heroes, Heroines, Celestial Warriors (2011)
- 282: One Continuous Stream of Vibrations (2011)
- 283: The Blood Beneath My Skin (2011)
- 284: One Hour of Fire, and Let All Be Ended! (2011)
- 285: A Violet Breath (2011)
- 286: 0 (2011)
- 287: n (2011)
- 288: Four Years Ago? Opium. (2012)
- 289: CALCULOR (2012)
- 290: Two-Legged Tigers and Crocodiles (2012)
- 291: Reduction to Elementary Particles and Radiation (2013)
- 292: Human Dignity in Times of Great Suffering and Loss (2013)
- 293: The Ruin and Absence of the World (2013)
- 294: Driven by the Warmth and Force of the Imagination (2013)
- 295: Reduced to a Square of Planed Wood (2013)
- 296: Down the Polished Edge of the Dead Man's Desk (2013)
- 297: I Cut the Liver Out of a Drifter (2013)
- 298: Your Fault Deserveth, I May Pierce Ye (2013)
- 299: Self-Traitor, I Do Bring the Spider Love (2013)
- 300: Songs for Girls (2014)
- 301: Weed Problem II - V (2014)
- 302: It Is Part of Space and Time (2014)
- 303: n(k) (2014)
- 304: 0(2^18×5^18) (2014)
- 305: Hostages Are Human Beings (2014)
- 306: It Is Not a Lack of Love (2014)
- 307: x0(2^18×5^18)p (2014)
- 308: Px0(2^18×5^18)p*k (2014)
- 309: ΣPx0(2^18×5^18)p*k*k (2014)
- 310: ΩΣPx0(2^18×5^18)p*k*k*k (2014)
- 311: Night's Great Perimeter (2014)
- 312: The Shadow of a Fleeting Dream (2014)
- 313: In the Lining of Your Skin (2014)
- 314: Saints and Angels and Martyrs and Holy Men (2014)
- 315: In Walked Orson (2014)
- 316: Near the Trout Hatchery at iDEATH (2014)
- 317: My Concerns Are Global (2014)
- 318: Where the Dead Men Lost Their Bones (2014)
- 319: The Person Witness (2014)
- 320: Following the Sand (2014)
- 321: Burn Dark Sincere Receiver (2014)
- 322: Scoundrel, Rogue, Monster (2014)
- 323: Killing, Dressing, Preparing Their Own Oxen and Swine (2014)
- 324: To Sit on the Night of Sadness (2014)
- 325: I Sent Myself to the Law (2015)
- 326: I Hope You Feel the Hopelessness (2015)
- 327: Elementary Machine Life (2015)
- 328: In Your Soft Authority (2015)
- 329: She Is as the Nights Are Horrible, Pt. 1 (2015)
- 330: She Is as the Nights Are Horrible, Pt. 2 (2015)
- 331: A Ghost Prehistoric, Pt. 1 (2015)
- 332: A Ghost Prehistoric, Pt. 2 (2015)
- 333: Of Course, the Personality Is Gone (2015)
- 334: It Is the Parabola (2015)
- 335: You Can't Buy Shoes in a Painting (2015)
- 336: Lorne Greene's Belgian Woodchuck Orgy (2015)
- 337: On Her Lips a Poison (2015)
- 338: Good Night, Sweet Prince, Vol. 1 (2015)
- 339: Good Night, Sweet Prince, Vol. 2 (2015)
- 340: Good Night, Sweet Prince, Vol. 3 (2015)
- 341: Good Night, Sweet Prince, Vol. 4 (2015)
- 342: Good Night, Sweet Prince, Vol. 5 (2015)
- 343: Virtue's Light, That Beams Beyond the Spheres (2015)
- 344: I Will Climb Alone (2015)
- 345: Moog Variations, Vol. 1 (2015)
- 346: Moog Variations, Vol. 2 (2015)
- 347: Moog Variations, Vol. 3 (2015)
- 348: Moog Variations, Vol. 4 (2015)
- 349: Moog Variations, Vol. 5 (2015)
- 350: Moog Variations, Vol. 6 (2015)
- 351: Total Bliss (2016)
- 352: Future Available Pamphlet (2016)
- 353: To Fill the Mouth of Their Monster (2016)

=== Roman numeral series (2009) ===
This series includes 100 releases numbered from I to C.

=== Aleph series (2009–2011) ===
This series includes 12 releases numbered from Aleph0 (א0) to Aleph11 (11א), although Aleph11 was never uploaded in its entirety.

=== Untitled series (2010) ===
This series includes 10 releases numbered from Untitled1 to Untitled10.

=== Non-numbered other releases ===
- Lemniscate 1 (2013)
- Incalzando (2013)
- Imperioso (2013)
- Irato (2013)
- Insistendo (2013)
- Duolo (2013)
- Quasi Una Fantasia (2013)
- Quos Amor Verus Tenuit Tenebit (2013)
- Ex Oblivione (2013)
- Ex Silentio (2013)
- Ex Umbra in Solem (2013)
- Non Omnis Moriar (2013)
- Omnibus Locis Fit Caedes (2013)
- Extinctus Amabitur Idem (2013)
- Sic Faciunt Omnes (2013)
- Z (2013)
- Fight Night For The Ghosts Of Heaven (2018)
- The Deathless Element (2019)
- In the House of Dust (2020)
- Quest for the Fountain of Apologies (2020)
- It's Jaws and Humming, Like Dancing, Like Glass (2020)
- Driftwood and Bone (2020)
- It Can't Be Just You Who Eats (2020)
- Howling (2020)
- A Standard Smile (2020)
- Distant Spring (2020)
- Memories Misremembered (2020)
- Phantom on Your Shoulder (2020)
- Appear/Not Appear (2020)
- It Is Not Nothing (2020)
- nice shirt (2021)
- Hidden Signs/Secret Meanings (2021)
- Folded Hands (2021)
- 19 nervous breakdowns (I'm about to have) (2021)
- say it again (2021)
- a thoughtless gift (2021)
- things that are lost (2021)
- Who Will Watch Over Me (2021)
- down and back (2021)
- speak to me wordlessly (2022)
- Invisible At Will (2022)
- the Living Wind (2022)
- Burn (2022)
- bloom (2022)
- In the Likeness of Oak (2022)
- He Shall Have It (2022)
- Murmuring Endearments (2022)
- In The Long Ago (2022)
- The Undifferentiated Waters (2022)
- The Dreadful Winds (2022)
- Half Of A Two Headed Creature (2022)
- Turn Pretty Flower Towards The Sun (2023)
- Ignite The Blood (2023)
- Such As Is Not (2023)
- Whose Eyes Are Brightness (2023)
- The Computer May Disagree (2023)
- I Have Heard Him Say These Things (2023)
- Green Glass Box (2023)
- Be Friendly Unto Me (2023)
- It Was as You Said (2023)
- On the Wrong Way (2023)
- The Sleeper's Mind (2023)
- Fragments of the Night (2023)
- Slightly Artificial (2024)
- A Way To Let It All Go (2024)

== See also ==
- Billionaire CT
- Boris
- Earth
- La Monte Young
- Lil Ugly Mane
- James Ferraro
- Natural Snow Buildings
- Yellow Swans
