= Mr. Roboto Project =

Volunteer-run cooperative venue in Pittsburgh, Pennsylvania, US

Coordinates: 40.4419°N 79.8856°W

The Mr. Roboto Project is a Do It Yourself (DIY) nonprofit volunteer-run cooperative venue and show space in Pittsburgh, Pennsylvania. Since the fall of 2011, it has been located at 5106 Penn Avenue. The structure of The Mr. Roboto Project was modeled partially after the 924 Gilman St club in Berkeley, CA, combined with elements of the East End Food Co-op in Pittsburgh, PA.

== Membership ==
The cooperative runs on a membership basis, with its members responsible for the direction of the venue. A board of directors made of between 6-10 elected positions deals with the day-to-day operations. Any member over 18 is eligible to run for a position. Meetings are held once a month, with both members and non-members encouraged to attend. The shows at the venue are primarily booked by local bands and promoters. While there are a wide variety of different musical groups and stylings being presented, many could be placed under the general banner of "punk."

== Early history ==
The beginnings of what would become the Mr. Roboto Project began in 1998. At that time there were few options for all-ages, DIY punk/hardcore/indie rock shows; most of the shows at that time were done in a handful of punk houses, most notably the Peach Pitt in South Oakland. The only consistent DIY venue was the Millvale Industrial Theater (MIT), which was outside the city limits. In 1998, the scene began to grow, the idea to create a collectively run venue in the spirit of 924 Gilman or ABC-No-Rio was hatched.

In January 1999, the first organizational meeting was held at the Peach Pitt. About 15-20 people showed up. At this meeting some of the basic structure of Roboto was formed including choosing to be set up as a cooperative with a Board of Directors rather than a strict collective. The original membership structure was decided at this meeting as well.

The name "Mr. Roboto's" was chosen as a working title. Several other ideas were originally tossed out, most having some local significance, such as "The Keystone Collective." However, in the end, most of these were poorly received by the group.

Over the coming months the group began a search for a location but had very little luck until late summer. During the previous year there had been a string of shows held at the Move Studio, a dance studio located in the borough of Wilkinsburg, just outside Pittsburgh's East End. Roboto checked out the two neighboring buildings to the Move Studio and was on the verge of signing a rent-to-own agreement for the building directly next door. At this time, the owner of the Move Studio expressed concern that noise from Roboto's shows would interfere with her dance studio. She recommended that the group contact the Wilkinsburg Chamber of Commerce to learn about other properties available in the area. This led to the group meeting up with Mark Smith, the head of the local Chamber of Commerce, and checking out an empty storefront location at 722 Wood Street.

Plans were made to begin renting the storefront in November 1999. At that time, Local promoter John Fail was looking for a venue for the second incarnation of his ADD Fest (an event with approximately 10 bands all playing 10-minute sets) and it was decided to make this Roboto's opening show. The event was planned for November 12, 1999. Due to some delays, members of Roboto were unable to get access to the space until November 11. ADD Fest 2 went off without major incident the following day. The group continued to rent the Wood Street storefront until Fall 2011, when they moved to their current location.

Prominent bands to play the original Roboto space include Anti-Flag, Taking Back Sunday, Against Me!, Karate, Ted Leo, Engine Down, The Blood Brothers, American Nightmare, The Nerve Agents, and Count the Stars.

== Roboto II ==
For a brief time in 2001, the Mr. Roboto Project opened a second Wilkinsburg venue called Roboto II. The space was a much larger, 400-capacity show space and zine library. The building was just blocks from the original Wood Street location, which remained open.

Roboto II featured larger touring acts including Atmosphere, Converge, Thursday, American Nightmare, Thrice, Bane, Piebald, The Lawrence Arms, Destroyer and many others. The space closed after less than a year of operation.

== Book ==
In 2012, the book "Building a Better Robot: 10 Years of the Mr. Roboto Project" was released. It is an action-packed book that documents how the Mr. Roboto Project took place.

== See also ==
- 924 Gilman Street
- ABC No Rio
- Che Cafe
- Lemp Neighborhood Arts Center
