= Grandpa's Ghost =

American band

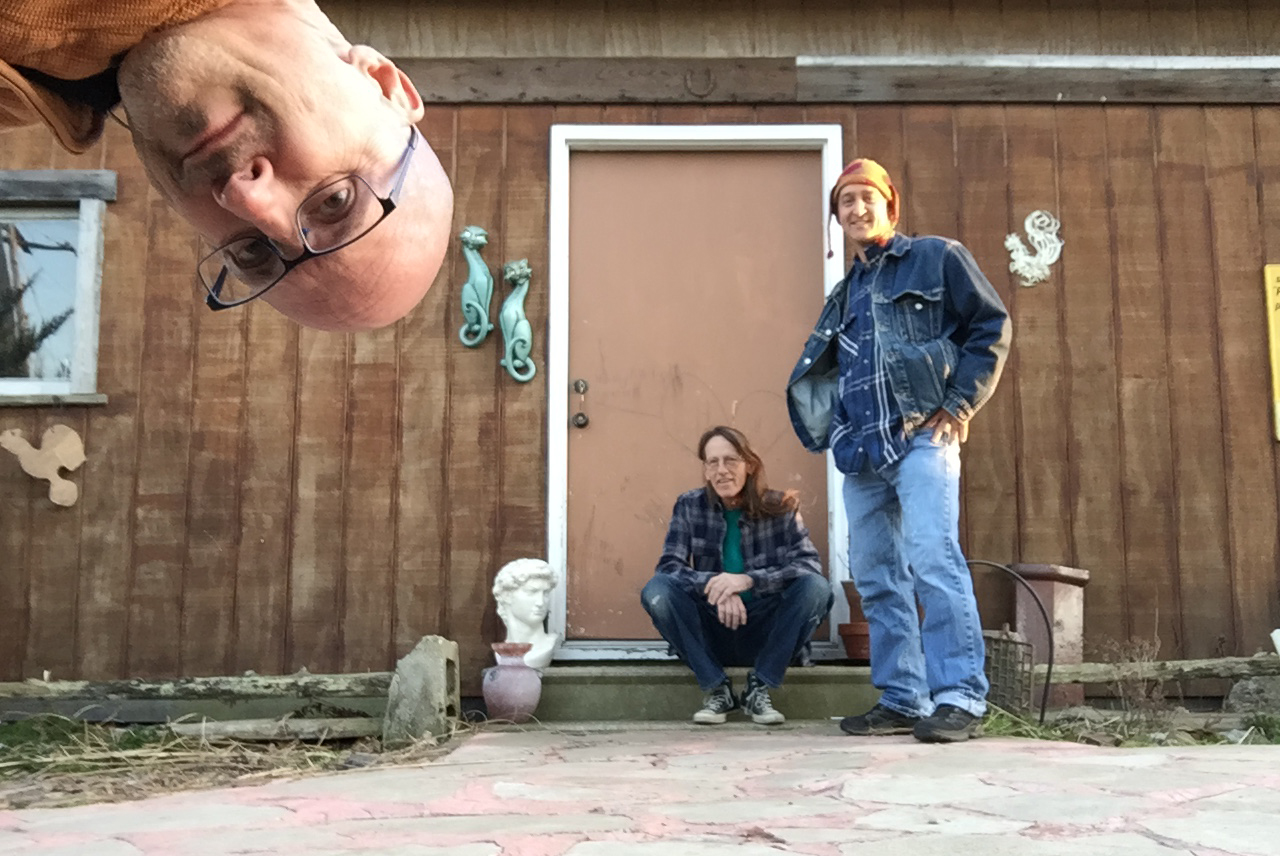
- Grandpa's Ghost, March 2017

Background information
- Origin: Pocahontas, Illinois, United States
- Genres: Experimental rock Country rock Psychedelic; Noise; Avant-garde
- Years active: 1995–present
- Labels: Upland Records; Phosphorus Recordings; Transduction Records
- Members: Ben Hanna; Bill Emerson; Jack Petracek
- Past members: Mark Robke; Pat Kennett; Tobi Parks; Christopher Dee; Eric Hall

Grandpa's Ghost is an experimental American band from Pocahontas, Illinois. The group was founded by Ben Hanna and Bill Emerson in 1995 on the outskirts of St. Louis, Missouri, in Pocahontas & Pierron, Illinois and was initially associated with the second wave of alt-country music from the region that included Uncle Tupelo, The Bottle Rockets, Son Volt, and Wilco. The current lineup features Hanna, Emerson, and Jack Petracek.

They released a trio of albums on their own Milk The Cow label in 1995 and 1996 to favorable reviews with Option magazine saying "the band hails from roughly the same geographic territory as the Uncle Tupelo/Son Volt/Wilco juggernaut, though the music tends toward the cerebral more often than the music of those bands". In 1999, the band signed to Upland Records, a label run by former SST Records co-owner Joe Carducci and ex-Black Flag/Descendents drummer Bill Stevenson. Their first album with Upland, Il Baccio, followed in 2000 and brought the band to national attention marking a shift into more experimental terrain with Jon Fine in the Village Voice describing them as "one of America's best bands". Tom Ridge, writing in The Wire, described the album as "psychedelicized Country rock...deeply fried". In 2001, Grandpa's Ghost were awarded "Best Eclectic/Uncategorizable Band" by the Riverfront Times, hailing Il Baccio as "a masterpiece of clashing chaos and inspired beauty".

The band's next release was a 2-CD set in 2001, Stardust and Smog/Early Autumn Waltz with disc one largely acoustic and disc two continuing the experimentation of Il Baccio. Bassist Mark Robke and drummer Pat Kennett departed the band shortly after its recording with engineer Jack Petracek joining on drums. Another two disc set, (The Tumble/Love Version), followed in late 2002, which featured a murkier, noisier sound with one reviewer describing it as "an all-out assault on the senses". The trio embarked on a national tour with Mike Watt to support the album.

From 2004, Grandpa's Ghost began a collaboration with filmmaker James Fotopoulos that would last through the end of the decade including appearances at the Chicago Underground Film Festival with the band playing alongside film projections of his work. A resulting album Music From The Fotopoulos Projects contained excerpts from these performances. Brad Reno writing in Trouser Press said, "Highly recommended, but don't listen to it in the dark". In 2007, the band released a four disc set collection of this work, Anesthetize the Dissonance of Your Cranium.

In January 2017 the band announced it would release its first album in almost ten years, titled The Carnage Queen, the following May.

== Discography ==
- Machine (Milk The Cow, 1995)
- Click and Drag (Milk The Cow, 1996)
- Gun Shy and Trigger Happy (Milk The Cow, 1996)
- Il Baccio (Upland, 2000)
- Stardust and Smog/Early Autumn Waltz at the Two/Fourteen (Upland, 2001, 2CD)
- (the tumble/love version) : hear past the static (Upland, 2002, 2CD)
- Music From the Fotopoulos Projects (Phosphorus, 2005)
- Anesthetize the Dissonance of Your Cranium (Phosphorus, 2007, 4CD)
- Bardot/The Void (Phosphorus, 2007, 2CD)
- Harry's Passion/Painted Skull and Other Fun Songs (Phosphorus, 2007, 2CD)
- The Prairie Drone Refraction (There Is No Time) EP (Echolocation/Phosphorus, 2007)
- The Carnage Queen (Transduction, 2017, 2LP)
- Lilac Perfume & Stomach Pump: A Brief History of Grandpa's Ghost 1995-2018 (Transduction, 2018)
- The London's Cat-Meat (Phosphorus, 2020)
