= S.E.M. Ensemble =

- Origin: New York City, New York, U.S.
- Genres: Contemporary classical
- Years active: 1970–present
- Website: www.semensemble.org

S.E.M. Ensemble is an American group dedicated to the performance of contemporary classical music. It was founded in 1970 by the Czech composer Petr Kotik, who serves as its director, and is based in New York City.

Kotik seems to have rather arbitrarily named the group from the middle syllable of "ensemble," adding periods after each letter to make the name more mysterious. He says the name means nothing except referring to what the group itself does.

The ensemble has performed numerous new works by a wide range of composers, which include Muhal Richard Abrams, John Cage, Julius Eastman, Roberto Carnevale, Morton Feldman, Pauline Oliveros, Henry Threadgill and La Monte Young, as well as works by Kotik himself.

In 1992, Kotik established The Orchestra of the S.E.M. Ensemble, which performs new compositions for full orchestra.

In April 2019 the S.E.M. Ensemble performed at the festival Neo-Pastiche: Changes in American Music at Black Mountain College Museum + Arts Center in Asheville, NC alongside Eugene Chadbourne, Jeff Witscher and other contemporary experimental artists.
