= Ostrava Days =

Ostrava Days is a three-week-long exposition of contemporary classical music that takes place biennially in the city of Ostrava, The Czech Republic. The event is considered to be one of the largest of its type in the world. Ostrava Days exposition is organized by the Ostrava Center for New Music (OCNM), an organization founded in 2000 by a Czech composer living in New York Petr Kotík. The institution was established solely for the purpose of organizing Ostrava Days, an event that consists of two parts—a summer institute and festival.

== Mission ==
The mission of the institute as well as of the festival is described by its founder Petr Kotík as follows. Ostrava Days "give composers, musicians and musicologists an opportunity to work with leading representatives of contemporary music". It is "a working and learning environment focused on orchestral composition".

== Programming ==
The festival strives to achieve originality and dissociation from usual and rather mainstream type of programing often observed in the program brochures of other major festivals of classical music in The Czech Republic. Classics of new music are systematically offered along the side of numerous premieres of new works. Festival programs have included major works by composers such as: Morton Feldman, John Cage, Luigi Nono, Iannis Xenakis, Karlheinz Stockhausen, György Ligeti, Edgard Varese, Galina Ustvolskaya, Christian Wolff, Alvin Lucier, Petr Kotík, Martin Smolka, Phill Niblock, Elliott Sharp, Bernhard Lang, Rebecca Saunders, Philip Glass, Kaija Saariaho.

== Timeline ==
The exposition regularly lasts for three weeks in August. Two weeks are devoted to the institute which events are open to official participants only. Over the course of these two weeks the participating composers, musicians and musicologists interact with each other by means of attending a number of lectures, seminars, and presentations. They also compose and practice pieces to be presented during the final week of the forum. The exposition opens to the public during its third week's festival. The festival offers a large number of concerts which program selected compositions by resident students, lecturers, guests, and others. Frank Kuznik, editor-in-chief and culture editor of The Prague Post, described Ostrava Days in his blog Cultured Cleveland as a "gathering of students, players and composers modeled after Darmstadt School".

== Admission and attendance ==
=== Students and lecturers ===
Attendance of the institute as well as the festival is international and in the past included artists from Europe, North America, South America, Asia and Australia. Students are chosen based on evaluation of no more than three scores and audio samples submitted to the assembly of lectors for each given year. Approximately 35 students are accepted for a season.

=== Resident ensembles ===
Resident ensembles of Ostrava Days are the Ostrava New Orchestra (symphony orchestra), Ostravská Banda (international chamber ensemble), Canticum Ostrava (choir), and Krulik Quartet (string quartet).

== Venues ==
The events of the Ostrava Days exposition take place in multiple venues in the city, including Philharmonic Hall of the City of Ostrava, Janáček Conservatory Ostrava, Multifunctional Auditorium GONG, National Moravian-Silesian Theatre, Coal Mine Michal Hall, St. Wenceslas Church, Parník Club, Gallery of Fine Arts in Ostrava.
