= Julius Eastman =

American composer (1940–1990)

- Undated portrait of Eastman

Background information
- Born: October 27, 1940; New York City, U.S.
- Died: May 28, 1990 (aged 49) Buffalo, New York, U.S.
- Occupations: Composer; pianist; vocalist; performance artist; conductor

Julius Eastman (October 27, 1940 – May 28, 1990) was an American composer. He was among the first composers to combine the processes of some minimalist music with other methods of extending and modifying his music as in some experimental music. He thus created what he called "organic music". In compositions like Stay On It (1973), his melodic motifs were not unlike the catchy refrains of then pop music.

He studied performance and composition in New York and contributed to new music scenes in New York City, Buffalo, New York, and Chicago, Illinois, touring and recording as a performer and enjoying many performances of his own music. As a conductor, musician, and vocalist, he had a close artistic relationship with Arthur Russell and worked briefly with Meredith Monk and Pierre Boulez. His voice can be heard in the Nonesuch recording of Peter Maxwell Davies' Eight Songs for a Mad King. He worked in a variety of musical styles, including classical, jazz, and crossover.

During the 1970s (and perhaps shortly thereafter), he openly expressed himself in terms of his race, sexual orientation, or both in at least one performance and also in his compositions, including Gay Guerrilla. These gestures were not well received. He began to contend with a lack of professional opportunities, falling into relative obscurity while struggling with substance use and homelessness in the 1980s.

After his early, possibly HIV/AIDS-related death in 1990, Kyle Gann remembered him in a much belated 1991 obituary in the Village Voice. In the 21st century, his work rose to international prominence within contemporary classical music. There have been many recent professional editions, performances, and recordings of his music, as well as some extended scholarly treatments of his life and work.

== Biography and music ==
=== Studies and debuts ===
Julius Eastman grew up in Ithaca, New York, with his mother, Frances Eastman, and younger brother, Gerry. He began studying piano at age 14 and made rapid progress. He studied at Ithaca College before transferring to the Curtis Institute of Music in Philadelphia. There he studied piano with Mieczysław Horszowski and composition with Constant Vauclain, and switched majors from piano to composition, graduating in 1963.

He made his debut as a pianist in 1966 at The Town Hall in New York City. Eastman had a rich, deep, and extremely flexible singing voice, for which he became noted in his 1973 Nonesuch recording of Eight Songs for a Mad King by the British composer Peter Maxwell Davies. Eastman's talents gained the attention of composer-conductor Lukas Foss, who conducted Davies' music in performance at the Brooklyn Philharmonic.

=== Early career and controversy in Buffalo ===
At the behest of Foss, Eastman joined the Creative Associates — a "prestigious program in avant-garde classical music" that "carried a stipend but no teaching obligations"—at SUNY Buffalo's Center for the Creative and Performing Arts. During this period, he met Petr Kotik, a Czech-born composer, conductor, and flutist. Eastman and Kotik performed together extensively in the early to mid-1970s. Along with Kotik, Eastman was a founding member of the S.E.M. Ensemble.

From 1971 he performed and toured with the group, and composed numerous works for it. During this period, fifteen of Eastman's earliest works were performed by the Creative Associates, including Stay On It (1973), an early augury of postminimalism and one of the first art music compositions inspired by progressions from popular music, presaging the later innovations of Arthur Russell and Rhys Chatham.

Although Eastman began to teach theory and composition courses over the course of his tenure, he left Buffalo in 1975 following a controversially ribald performance of John Cage's aleatoric Song Books by the S.E.M. Ensemble under the aegis of Morton Feldman. It included nudity interpolated by Eastman. Cage was incensed and said during an ensuing lecture that Eastman's "[ego] ... is closed in on homosexuality. And we know this because he has no other idea to express." Additionally, Eastman's friend Kyle Gann has speculated that his inability to acclimate to the more bureaucratic elements of academic life (including paperwork) may have hastened his departure from the university.

=== New York scenes ===
Shortly thereafter, Eastman settled in New York City, where he initially straddled the divide between the conventionally bifurcated "uptown" and downtown music scenes. Eastman often wrote his music following what he called an "organic" principle. Each new section of a work contained all the information from previous sections, though sometimes "the information is taken out at a gradual and logical rate."

This principle is clearest in his three works for four pianos, Evil Nigger, Crazy Nigger, and Gay Guerrilla, all from around 1979. The last of these appropriates Martin Luther's hymn, "A Mighty Fortress Is Our God," as a gay manifesto. Eastman said Northwestern University faculty regarded his "'Nigger' series" titles as derogatory, to which he replied that he "eschew[ed the] superficial or ... elegant", referring to the historical accomplishments of Black people and to the enduring effects of slavery in the United States.

In 1976, Eastman participated in a performance of Eight Songs for a Mad King conducted by Pierre Boulez at Lincoln Center. He served as the first male vocalist in Meredith Monk's ensemble, as documented on her influential album Dolmen Music (1981). He fostered a strong kinship and collaboration with Arthur Russell, conducting nearly all of his orchestral recordings (compiled as First Thought Best Thought [Audika Records, 2006]) and participating (as organist and vocalist) in the recording of 24→24 Music (1982; released under the imprimatur of Dinosaur L), a controversial disco-influenced composition that included the underground dance hits "Go Bang!" and "In the Cornbelt"; both featured Eastman's trademark bravado.

During this period, he also played in jazz ensembles with his brother Gerry, who previously played guitar in the Count Basie Orchestra, and the saxophone player Charles Gayle, and was active as a solo piano improviser. He played in and conducted the Brooklyn Philharmonia's CETA Orchestra (funded by the Comprehensive Employment and Training Act under the administration of the Cultural Council Foundation). He also coordinated the Philharmonia's Community Concert Series in conjunction with Foss and other composers of color. By 1980, he was regularly touring across the United States and internationally; a recording of a performance from that year at Northwestern University was released on the posthumous compilation Unjust Malaise (2005).

A 1981 piece for Eastman's cello ensemble, The Holy Presence of Joan d'Arc, was performed at The Kitchen in New York City. In 1986, the choreographer Molissa Fenley set her dance, Geologic Moments, to music of Philip Glass and two works by Eastman (an unknown work for two pianos and "One God" in which Eastman sang and played piano), which premiered at the Brooklyn Academy of Music.

=== Struggles and early death ===
Despondent about what he saw as a dearth of worthy professional opportunities, Eastman grew increasingly dependent on drugs after 1983. His life fell apart; many of his scores were impounded by the New York City Sheriff's Office following an eviction in the early 1980s, further impeding his professional development. While homeless, he briefly took refuge in Tompkins Square Park. His hope for a lectureship at Cornell University also failed to materialize during this period.

Despite a temporary attempt at a comeback, Eastman died alone at the age of 49 in Millard Fillmore Hospital in Buffalo, New York. Kyle Gann's January 22, 1991 Village Voice column served as Eastman's then months-belated obituary. While Eastman's death certificate cited cardiac arrest, sources speculate (and differ) as to whether his death may have been due to complications from HIV/AIDS. David Borden did not want to ask Eastman's mother and wrote that he was "evidently on the verge of starvation".

Eastman reportedly told the nurses he had no family or friends, but he did give them the name of his Buffalo roommate, dancer-choreographer Karl Singletary, who passed the news to Eastman's mother. Revival of Eastman's music has been a difficult task and has depended on people who worked with him because his notational methods were loose and open to interpretation.

== Style ==
Eastman's works often involve repeating, slowly evolving and discordant aleatoric sections, and pop structures (particularly in Stay On It (1973) or The Holy Presence of Joan D'Arc (1981), which repeat but dramatically evolve catchy riffs). As well as this, his long-form piano pieces like Evil Nigger (1979) and Gay Guerrilla (c. 1980) show his intent to dramatically explore his Black and gay identity through motifs that, in tone and repetition, represent heightening conflict, particularly strong in emotion for minimalism. Eastman described his works as "organic music" involving "gradual accrual and accumulation, often followed by gradual disintegration", where he would gradually and sometimes abruptly alter repeated refrains and phrases to create the basis for sheet music and its performance.

== Artistic legacy ==
The composer Mary Jane Leach found scores by Eastman, initially posting them to her website. They are now available through G. Schirmer.

A biography of Eastman, Gay Guerrilla: Julius Eastman and His Music, edited by Renée Levine Packer and Mary Jane Leach, was released in December 2015 on Eastman Studies in Music.

In 2018, publisher G. Schirmer announced it would restore, reconstruct, publish and promote his music, in collaboration with his estate managed by Julius's brother Gerry Eastman.

== Notable performances and discography ==
At Los Angeles's Hammer Museum in November 2002, Sean Franz Griffin programmed Eastman's "Tripod" in a performance led by violinist Mark Menzies. In 2008, Griffin premiered "Buffalo '70", a concert opera about Eastman for ten performers at the MATA Festival in New York.

In June 2006, the New York-based group Ne(x)tworks presented their score realization (by Cornelius Dufallo and Chris McIntyre) of Eastman's Stay On It at the ISSUE Project Room silo space on Carroll Street in Brooklyn.

In 2007, the California E A R Unit gave a performance of Crazy Nigger at REDCAT (The Roy and Edna Disney CalArts Theater in the Walt Disney Concert Hall Complex).

Eastman's piece Crazy Nigger was performed March 15, 2008, during the 7th Edition Dag in de Branding Festival, The Hague, the Netherlands.

On February 10, 2012, Luciano Chessa curated for Sarah Cahill's L@te Series of the Berkeley Art Museum/PFA the first Eastman retrospective. The concert included the performance of Eastman's Evil Nigger and Gay Guerrilla for six pianos, Eastman's last known composition, Our Father, and the first live performance of the Prelude to the Holy Presence of Joan d'Arc, transcribed by bass Richard Mix under Chessa's invitation. The event also included Chessa's DJ live set of NY house music recordings featuring Eastman and his collaborators. The preview piece for this event in the SF Chronicle, by Joshua Kosman, is the first full writeup on Eastman ever to appear in a major US newspaper.

On March 26, 2013, New Amsterdam Records released an album by Jace Clayton entitled The Julius Eastman Memory Depot. The album includes performances of Evil Nigger and Gay Guerilla by David Friend and Emily Manzo that have been manipulated and re-arranged by Clayton. The album's final track is a tribute to the late composer entitled "Callback from the American Society of Eastman Supporters."

Performer/Composer Amy Knoles recently created a 4.0 solo live electronic version of Crazy Nigger. She toured the Pacific Northwest and Europe in the Fall of 2013, with a program called Julius Eastman FOUND. She performed on the MalletKat with an elaborate system of loops, developed in Ableton LIVE with the Keith McMillen 12Step foot controller.

Lutosławski Piano Duo (Emilia Sitarz and Bartek Wąsik) have been performing his compositions regularly since 2014. Their repertoire contains Evil Nigger and Gay Guerilla (with Joanna Duda and Mischa Kozłowski). The premiere of their version of Crazy Nigger took place in December 2017 during KWADROFONIK FESTIVAL in Warsaw.

In October 2015, Bowerbird, a Philadelphia-based non-profit, presented Eastman's Crazy Nigger as the first event in a multi-year survey of the composer's work.

A larger Eastman retrospective took place at the London Contemporary Music Festival in December 2016, and included the presentation of seven Eastman works, several pieces closely associated with Eastman and an exhibition, spread over three nights.

On January 24, 2017, an evening of Eastman's works were presented as "A portrait of Julius Eastman" at the long-running modern classical music series, Monday Evening Concerts, in Los Angeles. The program consisted of Prelude to the Holy Presence of Joan d'Arc for solo baritone singer, The Holy Presence of Joan d'Arc for ten cellos, and Crazy Nigger for four pianos. The concert was very well received by a nearly sold-out audience in the Zipper Concert Hall at the Colburn School for the Performing Arts.

The 2017 MaerzMusik festival opened with three of Julius Eastman's works for four pianos on March 17. Furthermore, from 17th to 26 March, the space of SAVVY Contemporary became a documentation center dedicated to the oeuvre of Julius Eastman.

In May 2017, after more than three years of research, Bowerbird presented "That Which Is Fundamental" - a four-concert retrospective and month-long exhibition of Eastman's work. Included in the festival were the modern premieres of several of Eastman's early works, including Macle and Thruway. This project was the first retrospective produced in collaboration with the Eastman Estate.

In September 2017, contemporary music festival Sacrum Profanum in Krakow, presented four concerts with nine Julius Eastman's compositions in total. Extensive research of the curator Krzysztof Pietraszewski, assisted by Mary Jane Leach, Petr Kotik and Michał Mendyk resulted in wide and diverse composer's picture - Eastman was one of two main figures of 2017 edition of the festival (among Moondog). Petr Kotik with S.E.M. Ensemble prepared interpretations of Joy Boy, Our Father, Piano 2, and Macle, Anton Lukoszevieze and Apartment House performed Buddha, Femenine [sic], Stay On It, and Hail Mary and Arditti Quartet performed a three-string quartet version (commissioned from Tomasz Jakub Opałka by Sacrum Profanum festival) of Evil Nigger. This new version of this famous piece was a world premiere, and Our Father and Joy Boy were presented in newly restored versions.

In February 2018, Luciano Chessa completed his edition of Eastman's Symphony No. II. The Faithful Friend, The Lover Friend's Love for the Beloved, Eastman's only work for large orchestra. On November 20 Chessa conducted the orchestra of the Mannes School of Music in the premiere of Eastman II at Lincoln Center's Alice Tully Hall in NYC to a considerable acclaim. The preview piece in The New York Times featured clips from the rehearsal of the piece, and a review followed

In March 2018, SAVVY Contemporary Berlin in collaboration with MaerzMusik Festival continued their interdisciplinary project on Julius Eastman with a series of German premieres of his pieces as well as world-premieres of newly commissioned pieces – in a series of concerts, an exhibition and a symposium with Mary Jane Leach, George E. Lewis, Christine Rusiniak, Kodwo Eshun, Rocco Di Pietro, and many others. In 2020, SAVVY Contemporary published a collection of essays, librettos, lyrics, memories, photos, personal anecdotes called We Have Delivered Ourselves from the Tonal — Of, Towards, On, For Julius Eastman with contributors like George E. Lewis, Kodwo Eshun, Mary Jane Leach, and many others.

In 2018, visual artist Tiona Nekkia McClodden curated an exhibition based on her research around Eastman at New York's The Kitchen. It included performances of his work and work of contemporary artists inspired by Eastman including Carolyn Lazard, Sondra Perry, and Chloe Bass and others.

In 2018, visual artist Michael Anthony Garcia and composer Russell Reed performed Femenine [sic] with the Austin Chamber Music Festival.

In September 2019, festival Musica in Strasbourg (France) presented the composer's three pieces for four pianos performed by Melaine Dalibert, Stéphane Ginsburgh, Nicolas Horvath and Wilhem Latchoumia. The concert was recorded and published by Sub Rosa.

In October 2019, the Sacrum Profanum festival in Krakow presented The Holy Presence of Joan D'Arc with Prelude and premiered another commissioned version of Evil Nigger, this time arranged by Piotr Peszat for four accordions, performed by Rafał Łuc and Maciej Frąckiewicz.

In February 2020, the American piano sextet Grand Band, performed Gay Guerilla in the Peak Debut Series at Montclair State University, featuring six grand pianos played by Erika Dohi, David Friend, Paul Kerekes, Blair McMillen, Lisa Moore, and Isabelle O'Connell.

In the summer of 2021, Davóne Tines and ten cellists recorded Eastman’s The Holy Presence of Joan d’Arc at Looking Glass Arts, in West Fulton, New York.

In October 2021, Eastman was the subject of BBC Radio 3's Composer of the Week.

Eastman's piece Crazy Nigger was featured in three performances in late 2021 and early 2022 presented by the Rudolfinum Gallery and the Czech Philharmonic in Prague, Czech Republic.

The 2021 Ojai Music Festival in Ojai California featured several works by Eastman.

British electronic musician Loraine James released an album inspired by Eastman's work on October 7, 2022.

On December 2, 2022, Helsinki-based record label Frozen Reeds announced the first ever vinyl run for a 1974 recording of Femenine by the S.E.M. Ensemble with Eastman on piano, due for release May 30, 2023. The recording was remastered from the original high-definition tape transfer by Jim O'Rourke at his Steamroom studio in Japan. The release features republished liner notes written by Eastman and Mary Jane Leach.

In April 2023, the Cleveland Orchestra, conducted by Franz Welser-Möst, performed Eastman's Symphony No. II. The UK Premiere of Symphony No. II was given at a BBC Proms concert on 24 August 2024 by the BBC Symphony Orchestra, conducted by Dalia Stasevska.

In August 2024, Melbourne-based Astra Chamber Music Society gave the Australian premiere of four of Eastman's works in a concert dedicated to his music.

== Known works ==
- Piano Pieces I - IV (1968) for solo piano
- Thruway (1970) for flute, clarinet, trombone, violin, cello, soprano solo, off stage jazz trio, SATB choir, electronics
- The Moon's Silent Modulation (1970) for dancers, vocalists and chamber ensemble
- Touch Him When (1970) for piano 4 hands
- Trumpet (1970) for 7 trumpets
- Macle (1971) for voices and electronics
- Comp 1 (1971) for solo flute
- Mumbaphilia (1972) for solo performer and dancers
- Wood in Time (1972) for 8 metronomes
- Tripod (1972) instrumentation unknown, score fragment for one treble voice and one tape part exists
- Colors (1973) for 14 women's voices and tape
- Stay On It (1973) for no fixed instrumentation, although piano, percussion, and voice were always included
- 440 (1973) for voice, violin, viola and double bass
- That Boy (1974) for small instrumental ensemble
- Joy Boy (1974) for 4 treble instruments
- Femenine (1974) for chamber ensemble
- Masculine (1974) for small instrumental ensemble
- If You're So Smart, Why Aren't You Rich? (1977) for violin, 2 French horns, 4 trumpets, 2 trombones, tuba, piano, 2 chimes and 2 basses
- Nigger Faggot (1978) for bell, percussion, and strings
- Dirty Nigger (1978) for 2 flutes, 2 saxophones, bassoon, 3 violins, and 2 double basses
- Evil Nigger (1979) for any number of similar instruments, most commonly 4 pianos
- Gay Guerilla (ca. 1980) for any number of similar instruments, most commonly 4 pianos
- Crazy Nigger (ca. 1980) for any number of similar instruments, most commonly 4 pianos
- The Holy Presence of Joan d'Arc (1981) for ten cellos
- Untitled [Prelude to The Holy Presence of Joan d'Arc] (1981) for solo voice
- Symphony No. II - The Faithful Friend: The Lover Friend's Love for the Beloved (1983) for orchestra
- His Most Qualityless Majesty (1983) for piano and voice
- Hail Mary (1984) for voice and piano
- Buddha (1984) for unspecified instrumentation
- Piano 2 (1986) for solo piano
- Our Father (1989) for 2 male voices

=== Recordings ===
- 2026 - Julius Eastman Vol. 5: Gay Guerrilla performed by Wild Up (New Amsterdam Records)
- 2024 - Julius Eastman Vol. 4: The Holy Presence performed by Wild Up (New Amsterdam Records)
- 2023 - Femenine performed by Talea Ensemble and Harlem Chamber Players (Kairos)
- 2023 - Julius Eastman Vol. 3: If You’re So Smart, Why Aren’t You Rich? performed by Wild Up (New Amsterdam Records)
- 2022 - Julius Eastman Vol. 2: Joy Boy performed by Wild Up (New Amsterdam Records)
- 2021 - Julius Eastman - Three Extended Pieces for Four Pianos performed by Melaine Dalibert, Stéphane Ginsburgh, Nicolas Horvath and Wilhem Latchoumia (Sub Rosa)
- 2021 - Julius Eastman Vol. 1: Femenine performed by Wild Up (New Amsterdam Records)
- 2021 - "Stay On It” performed by Sō Percussion (Eric Cha-Beach, Josh Quillen, Adam Sliwinski, Jason Treuting), MEDIAQUEER (Darian Thomas, Phong Than), Adam Tendler, Shelley Washington, Alex Sopp, Beth Meyers, Grey Mcmurray
- 2020 - Femenine performed by ensemble 0 and Aum Grand Ensemble (Sub Rosa)
- 2020 - Touch Him When performed by HOCKET
- 2019 - Femenine performed by Apartment House (Another Timbre)
- 2018 - Piano Interpretations performed by Kukuruz Quartet (Intakt Records)
- 2017 - Stay On It performed by Abdu Ali and Horse Lords
- 2016 - Femenine performed by the SEM Ensemble (Frozen Reeds)
- 2014 - "Unchained" performed by Lutosławski Piano Duo and Friends - (pieces by Julius Eastman and Tomasz Sikorski) Bołt Records
- 2014 - Piano 2 performed by Joseph Kubera on Book of Horizons (New World 80745)
- 2005 - Unjust Malaise, by various artists (New World 80638) (Includes Stay On It; If You're So Smart, Why Aren't You Rich; Prelude to The Holy Presence of Joan d'Arc; The Holy Presence of Joan d'Arc; Gay Guerrilla; Evil Nigger; Crazy Nigger; and Spoken Introduction to Northwestern University Concert)
- 1993 - Gagné, Nicole V. and David Avidor. Agamemnon (opera with Julius Eastman in title role)
- 1990 - Peter Gordon. Leningrad Xpress (New Tone Records 516702) (Includes Julius Eastman, voice.)
- 1987 - Davies, Peter Maxwell. Miss Donnithorne's Maggot; Eight Songs for a Mad King. London: Unicorn-Kanchana. (Includes Julius Eastman, baritone.)
- 1983 - Monk, Meredith. Turtle Dreams (Includes Julius Eastman, organ.)
- 1982 - Dinosaur L. 24→24 Music (Includes Julius Eastman, keyboards and voice.)
- 1981 - Monk, Meredith. Dolmen Music. (Includes Julius Eastman, percussion and voice.)
- 1972 - Kolb, Barbara, and Richard Moryl. New York: Desto. (Includes Julius Eastman, narrator, on Side A.)
