= Sgt. Petsound's Lonely Hearts Club Band =

Remix album (Mashup) by The Beachles (Clayton Counts)
- Released: September 5, 2006
- Recorded: July 12, 1965 – c. April 17, 1966 (The Beach Boys sessions), 6 December 1966 – 21 April 1967 (The Beatles sessions)
- Genres: Psychedelic pop; art rock; mashup
- Length: 69:21
- Label: Self-released
- Producer: Clayton Counts

Professional ratings
Review scores
Source	Rating
Entertainment Weekly	favorable

Sgt. Petsound's Lonely Hearts Club Band is a track-for-track mashup of The Beach Boys' Pet Sounds with The Beatles' Sgt. Pepper's Lonely Hearts Club Band by Clayton Counts. Released under the pseudonym The Beachles, it was posted to Counts's blog on September 5, 2006.

The album received favorable mentions in Entertainment Weekly and USA Today, as well as various blogs around the world. Shortly after release, Counts received a cease and desist order from EMI's attorneys around September 8, 2006. Notably, the letter included a demand for Counts to hand over the IP addresses of everyone who downloaded or streamed the songs. Counts removed the songs, but refused to give up the IPs and fired back with a lengthy missive on his blog. The incident drew the attention of the Associated Press and Rolling Stone, and resulted in a letter-writing campaign and a boycott of EMI and Capitol Records on behalf of Counts.

Counts linked to the tracker site isoHunt as a place to still download the album after his cease and desist letter.

== Track listing ==
All songs are created using tracks from The Beach Boys and The Beatles.

No.	Title	Length
1.	"Wouldn't Sgt. Petsound Be Nice?"	2:44
2.	"You Still Believe in My Friends"	2:54
3.	"That's Not Lucy"	4:43
4.	"Don't Talk (Get Better)"	6:54
5.	"I'm Fixing It, Dayhole"	7:22
6.	"She's Going Away for Awhile"	2:20
7.	"Being for the Benefit of Sloop John B!"	6:34
8.	"God Only Knows What I'd Be Within You"	5:34
9.	"I Know There're Sixty-Four Answers"	7:05
10.	"Today, Rita"	3:44
11.	"I Just Wasn't Made for Good Mornings"	7:17
12.	"Sgt. Petsound's Lonely Hearts Club Band (Reprieve)"	3:57
13.	"A Day in the Life of Caroline"	4:49
14.	"Runout Groove"	3:24
Total length:		69:21

== Son of a Beachle ==
In 2021, a media folder on Clayton Count's blog was discovered containing an unfinished sequel to Sgt. Petsound's Lonely Hearts Club Band titled Son of a Beachle. This album was originally meant to contain 32 tracks, but only 11 of said tracks were ever made. Son of a Beachle uses many more samples than its predecessor, and goes for a more humorous approach.
