= Natural Snow Buildings =

French avant-folk duo

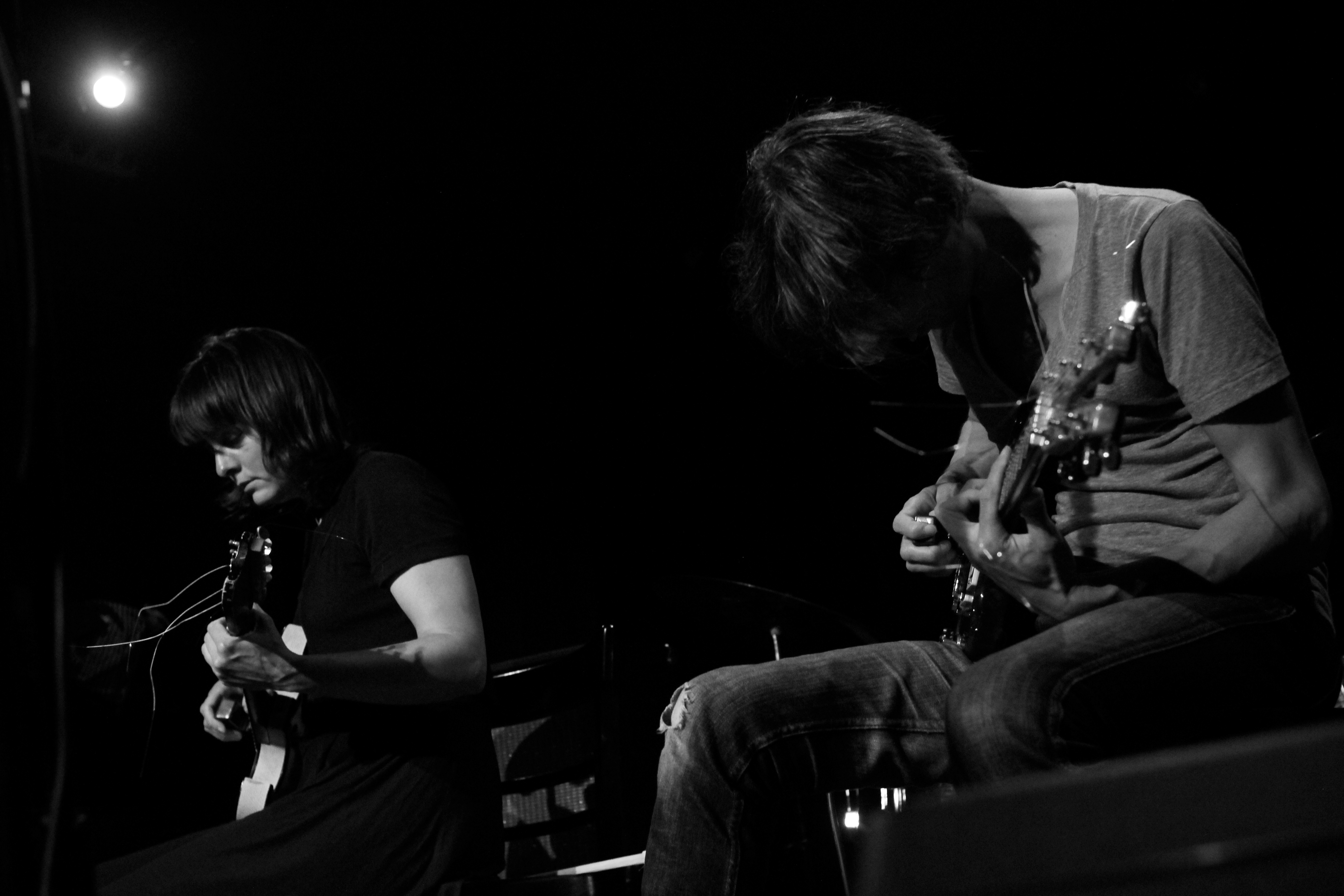
- Natural Snow Buildings in 2014

Background information
- Origin: Vitré, France; Paris, France (early)
- Genres: Free folk; drone; lo-fi; psychedelic folk; ambient; post-rock
- Years active: 1998-present
- Labels: Ba Da Bing; Blackest Rainbow; Students of Decay; Digitalis Industries; Vulpiano; Dull Knife; Handmade Birds; Primary Numbers
- Members: Mehdi Ameziane; Solange Gularte

Natural Snow Buildings is a French musical duo, consisting of artists Mehdi Ameziane and Solange Gularte. Their music has been classified as free folk—an experimental form of psychedelic folk which emphasizes drones, ambience and non-Western influences. Formed in Paris in 1998, the duo has released numerous albums, many of them in extremely limited quantities before later being reissued by labels such as Ba Da Bing, and featuring pagan or broadly occult themes and references.

Both members of Natural Snow Buildings release music also as solo artists under their own aliases, with Mehdi Ameziane recording as TwinSisterMoon and Solange Gularte recording as Isengrind.

== History ==
Ameziane and Gularte initially met at a Paris university in 1997, in a library where a film was playing. They became friends, taking interest in each other's hobbies; although Ameziane was a musically substantial guitarist while Gularte was a classically trained musician, the two had not yet begun making music together. In May 1998, the two officially started their band and began home recording their music, self-releasing two cassettes, Witch-Season and Two Sides of a Horse in 1999 and 2000, and in 2001 recorded Ghost Folks, released in 2003. They self-released a double CD album, The Winter Ray, in a limited edition, and, after moving from Paris to Vitré, Brittany in 2004, recorded The Dance of the Moon and the Sun (2006). They then each issued solo material before producing more material as a duo.

Most of their albums have only been released in small, often hand-crafted and individually designed, limited editions. However, since 2012 they have released several records on prominent independent labels such as Ba Da Bing Records, which has also reissued some of their earlier recordings, including Night Coercion Into the Company of Witches and the Isengrind/TwinSisterMoon/Natural Snow Buildings split The Snowbringer Cult. Their work has been variously compared with such bands as Popol Vuh, Flying Saucer Attack, and the Tower Recordings. They make many references to horror films in their song titles; for example Santa Sangre (with the track "Santa Sangre Part I & II" on Daughter of Darkness), The Blair Witch Project (The track "Mary Brown" on The Dance of the Moon and the Sun is a reference to a character from this film) and director John Carpenter (a track on The Dance of the Moon and the Sun).

== Discography—Natural Snow Buildings ==
=== Albums ===
- Ghost Folks (2003)
- The Winter Ray (2004)
- The Dance of the Moon and the Sun (2006)
- Between The Real And The Shadow (2008)
- Sung To The North (2008) (released as a bonus CD-R with a special edition of The Snowbringer Cult)
- The Snowbringer Cult (2008)
- Laurie Bird (2008)
- Slayer of the King of Hell (2008)
- The Wheel of Sharp Daggers (2008)
- Night Coercion Into the Company of Witches (2008)
- Sunlit Stone (2008) (released with a special edition of the 2008 Students of Decay reissue of The Dance of the Moon and the Sun)
- Daughter of Darkness (2009)
- Daughter of Darkness V (2009)
- Shadow Kingdom (2009)
- The Centauri Agent (2010)
- Waves of the Random Sea (2011)
- Chants of Niflheim (2011)
- Beyond the Veil (2012)
- The Night Country (2014)
- Terror's Horns (2015)
- The Ladder (2015) (released as a bonus CD with a special pre-order edition of Terror's Horns)
- Aldebaran (2016)

=== Live albums ===
- Live Sheffield & London 2012 (2012)
- Live At Cragg Vale (2014)

=== EPs ===
- The Moonraiser (2008) (released with a special edition of the 2008 Students of Decay reissue of The Dance of the Moon and the Sun)
- The Sundowner (2008) (released with a special edition of the 2008 Students of Decay reissue of The Dance of the Moon and the Sun)

=== Compilations ===
- I Dream of Drone (5CDr box set, only one copy produced & given free to a friend of the band: Jed B)
- Tracks on the Bloody Snow (CD-R, 2 known versions: one with brown sleeve, one with red. Compilation of early recordings 1998/1999)

=== Demos ===
- Witch-Season (1999)
- Two Sides of a Horse (2000)
- Shall I Kill My Own Child, I Will Never Sing the Glory of Satan! (2001)

== Discography—solo ==
=== TwinSisterMoon ===
==== Albums ====
- When Stars Glide Through Solid (2007)
- Levels and Crossings (2007)
- The Snowbringer Cult (Tracks 9–16 on CD1) (2008)
- The Hollow Mountain (2009)
- Then Fell The Ashes (2010)
- Bogyrealm Vessels (2012)

==== EPs ====
- Rivers of Blood Ending in the Sun (released with a special edition of the 2008 Digitalis reissue of Levels and Crossings)
- Bride of the Spirits
- Isengrind & TwinSisterMoon - Tide Leftovers (2012)

=== Isengrind ===
==== Albums ====
- Golestân (2007)
- The Snowbringer Cult (Tracks 1–8 on CD1) (2008)
- Journey of the Seven Stars (2009)
- Modlitewnik (2010)
- Night of Raining Fire (2012)
- Underflesh (2014)

==== EPs ====
- Isengrind & TwinSisterMoon - Tide Leftovers (2012)
