= Petr Kotik =

Czech composer (born 1942)

Petr Kotik (surname originally Kotík) (born January 27, 1942, in Prague, Czech Republic) is a composer, conductor and flutist based in New York City. In Prague, he founded and directed Musica Viva Pragensis (1961–64) and the QUAX Ensemble (1966–69). He moved to the United States in 1969 at the invitation of Lukas Foss and Lejaren Hiller to join the Center for Creative and Performing Arts at the University at Buffalo. He has lived in New York City since 1983.

== Education ==
Kotik entered a conservatory at the age of 14 and began composing in his late teens. He graduated from Prague Conservatory in 1961, the Vienna Music Academy in 1966, and AMU Prague in 1969. From 1960 to 1963, Kotik studied composition with composer Jan Rychlík in Prague. From 1963 to 1966 Kotik studied at the University of Music and Performing Arts Vienna with Karl Schieske, Hans Jelinek and Friedrich Cerha. In 1968 he performed electronic music with the Czech psychedelic rock band Rebels, that was formed in 1967 by Jiří Korn.

== Career ==
Kotik is the director of the S.E.M. Ensemble, which he founded in 1970. Kotik has given performances as conductor and performer, aka the Orchestra of the S.E.M. Ensemble. Kotik has received numerous commissions and composition grants from the National Endowment for the Arts, as well as a 1996 Foundation for Contemporary Arts Grants to Artists Award.

In 1992, Kotik conducted Atlas Eclipticalis by John Cage with the 86-piece Orchestra of the S.E.M. Ensemble in Tribute to John Cage at Carnegie Hall. Since then, Kotik has expanded the S.E.M. Ensemble into The Orchestra of the S.E.M. Ensemble. In 1999, after conducting Gruppen by Karlheinz Stockhausen, Kotik initiated a project of compositions for 3 orchestras and commissioned the creation of new 3-orchestra works by Alvin Lucier, Christian Wolff, Martin Smolka, Phill Niblock and Olga Neuwirth. In 2001, Kotik founded the biennial Ostrava Days, an Institute and Festival of New Music in Ostrava, Czech Republic.

Kotik's most famous compositions are Music for 3 (1964) written for a piano and two strings; Spontano (1964) for a piano and an ensemble (composed for Frederic Rzewski); Kontrabandt (1967), a live electronic work commissioned by the WDR Electronic Music Studio; Many Many Women (1975–78) on a text by Gertrude Stein; and Letters to Olga (1988–91) on a text by Václav Havel. His orchestra pieces include: Quiescent Form (1994–96); the one-hour-long Music in Two Movements (1998–2002); Variations for 3 Orchestras (2002–2005); and Spheres and Attraction (2005–2006) for two voices, a string quartet and percussion on a text by R. Buckminster Fuller.

Kotik's massive yet modestly named Fragment, which he conducted with his S.E.M. Ensemble, and which finally gives me sufficient pretext to voice the overdue sentiment that he is one of the best composers working today. [...] He produced some of the most durable, though still little-known musical monuments of the post-Cage 70s, and his output has been amazingly consistent in quality. —New York music critic and composer Kyle Gann, The Village Voice, 1998.

== Personal life ==
His father was the painter Jan Kotík. He is married to the curator and art historian Charlotta Kotik, great-granddaughter of Tomáš Garrigue Masaryk, and has a son, Tomas (Tom), who is a New York-based sculptor. His other son, Jan Jakub Kotík, was born in 1972 and died of cancer in 2007.
