= Fleetwood Lifeboat Station =

RNLI lifeboat station in Lancashire, England

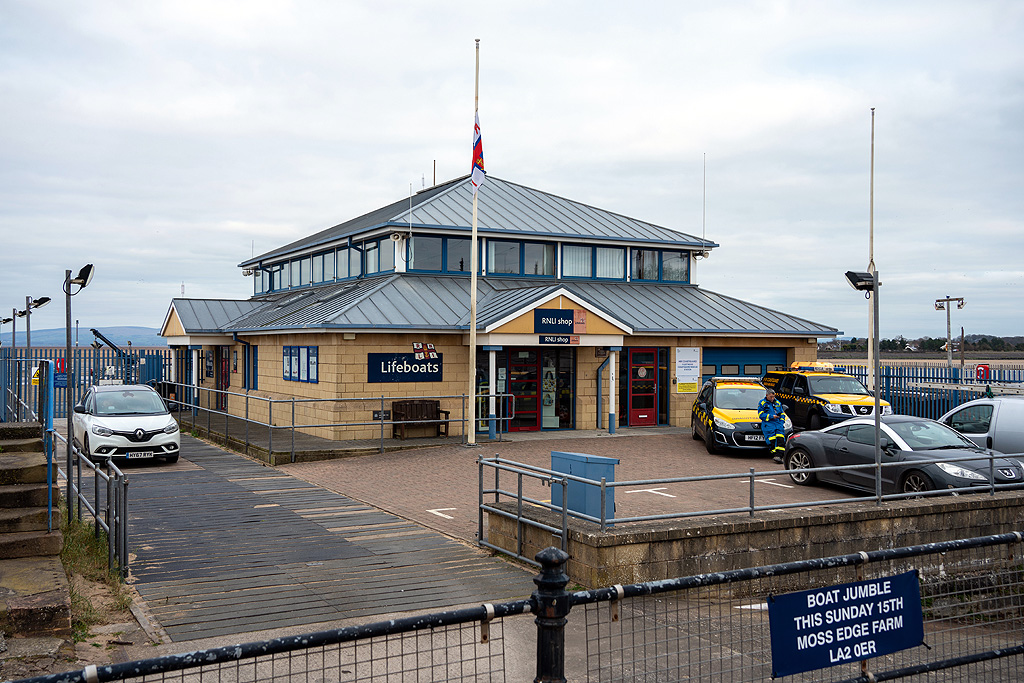
- Fleetwood Lifeboat Station in 2023

- Location within Lancashire

General information
- Type: RNLI Lifeboat Station
- Location: The Esplanade, Fleetwood, Lancashire, FY7 6DN, England
- Coordinates: 53°55′39.9″N 3°00′23.3″W
- Opened: 1859
- Owner: Royal National Lifeboat Institution

Website
- Fleetwood RNLI Lifeboat Station

Fleetwood Lifeboat Station is located on The Esplanade at the port of Fleetwood, a Lancashire town at the north end of The Fylde, sitting at the mouth of the River Wyre.

A lifeboat was first stationed at Fleetwood by the Royal National Lifeboat Institution (RNLI) in 1859.

The station currently operates 13-14 Kenneth James Pierpoint (ON 1321), a Shannon-class All-weather lifeboat, on station since 2016, and a smaller D-class (IB1) Inshore lifeboat, Harbet (D-853), on station since 2021.

== History ==
At a meeting of the RNLI committee of management on Thursday 2 September 1858, in response to a letter from Capt. Edward Frodsham Noel K. Wasey, RN, H.M. Coastguard, and following a visit by the Inspector of Lifeboats, the RNLI agreed to place a lifeboat at Fleetwood.

A new boathouse was constructed opposite the North Euston Hotel at a cost of £174-18s-6d, and a Peake-class 30 ft (9.1 m) self-righting 'Pulling and Sailing (P&S) lifeboat, one with sails and (six) oars, was constructed by Forrestt of Limehouse, London, costing £140. The boat arrived on station on 20 March 1859. John Fox was appointed Coxswain, and Capt. Wasey appointed Honorary Secretary.

As Fleetwood is a port frequented by passenger-steamers in addition to some coasting-trade, it is important that it should be provided with a life-boat, although wrecks have not been of very frequent occurrence in the locality.

— The Life-Boat, Vol. IV, No. 33, 1 July 1859

Contrary to the expected few calls, the request for a lifeboat by Capt. Wasey could not have come a moment too soon. In 1860, the lifeboat was involved in no less than three medal rescues. On 22 January 1860, the Fleetwood lifeboat was towed over four miles by a steam-tug, to the schooner Ann Mitchell of Montrose, where after seven attempts, the sole survivor was rescued. Coxswain Fox and Capt. Wasey were each awarded the RNLI Silver Medal. For a further two services, on 19 February 1860, rescuing four men, and on 20 October 1860, rescuing 15 men and the Pilot, Capt. Wasey was awarded second and third service clasps to his silver medal, a remarkable achievement in one year.

In 1862, following a gift of £340 from Miss Mary Wasey, a new lifeboat was provided for Fleetwood, a 32 ft (9.8 m) 10-oared self-righting boat, built by Forrestt. She arrived in November 1862, transported free of charge from London to Fleetwood by the London and North Western Railway Company, and was named Edward Wasey.

Following a three-year closure of the station between 1930 and 1933, for the reconstruction of the boathouse, Fleetwood would receive their first motor-powered lifeboat. The 38 ft (12 m) self-righting lifeboat had a 35-hp petrol engine, delivering 7 knots (13 km/h; 8.1 mph), and was named Sir Fitzroy Clayton (ON 628), after Col. Sir Fitzroy Clayton, KCVO, chairman of the Institution from 1908 until his death in 1915. The lifeboat was previously stationed at Newhaven, Sussex, where she rescued 108 lives.

Fleetwood latest All-weather lifeboat is a £2.2M state-of-the-art Shannon-class lifeboat. 13-14 Kenneth James Pierpoint (ON 1321), arrived on station at 13:14 on 26 June 2016. The lifeboat was funded by the legacy of Miss Kathleen Pierpoint from Altrincham, Cheshire, who died in 2012, with the lifeboat named in memory of her brother Kenneth, a young RAF pilot killed in World War Two in 1942.

== Fleetwood boathouses ==
The 1858 lifeboat house was nearly washed away in a storm of 1863, and so a new brick-built boathouse, costing £161-17s-10d, was constructed at Pharos Place, next to the Pharos Lighthouse. Today it is a private residence.

Following a gift of £900 from Col. William Blackburne, a new lifeboat was provided for Fleetwood in 1879, Child of Hale, and the residue of the money funded the construction of a third boathouse and slipway, now thought to have been close to the site of the current lifeboat station. A larger 46-foot boat arrived in Fleetwood in 1887, Edith (ON 76) to become the No.2 boat, and was moored afloat.

Fleetwood had for a long time been a key Railway Hub and Steamer terminus, with vessels arriving and departing from and to the Isle of Man, Belfast, Barrow and Ardrossan, tying up right alongside the railway station. In 1840, the fastest way to Glasgow from London was via a steamer from Fleetwood to Ardrossan.

In 1893, the Lancashire and Yorkshire Railway, and the London and North Western Railway, needed to extend their harbour moorings, right over the site of the lifeboat station slipway. Funded by the railway companies, a fourth boathouse and slipway was constructed in 1894, which was large enough to accommodate the 46-foot lifeboat; by now the single remaining boat in Fleetwood, the Child of Hale (ON 75) having been retired in 1892.

However, the slipway location meant it suffered from a regular build up of sand and shingle, to the point where the boat was having to be kept moored afloat, so in 1901, a fifth site was acquired 80 yards east of the Beach Lighthouse, or Low Light as more commonly known, and a new slipway constructed. Having been the cause of the previous relocation, the railway companies moved the 1894 boathouse, and re-constructed it over the new slipway. This boathouse remained in use for the next 75 years, although the station was closed between 1930 and 1933 for alterations, and the construction of another new slipway, ready for the arrival of a new motor-powered lifeboat, the Sir Fitzroy Clayton (ON 628).

The 1901 boathouse finally became redundant in 1976, and was demolished in 1977, when the new Waveney-class lifeboat Lady of Lancashire (ON 1036) arrived. This boat was designed to be moored afloat, and required the construction of a mooring pen.

A small boathouse, constructed in the late 1960s to house a D-class Inshore lifeboat, was washed away in a storm of November 1977, and completely destroyed. The launch tractor was found buried in deep sand, and the Inshore lifeboat (D-187) was found on Pilling Sands, returning to service after repairs.

Finally, a new RNLI and Coastguard building was constructed in 2006, complete with crew facilities, a retail outlet, and secure storage for the D-class lifeboat, which is launched with the aid of a davit.

== Station honours ==
The following are awards made at Fleetwood:

- RNLI Silver Medal
  Capt. Edward F. N. K. Wasey, RN, H.M. Coastguard - 1860
  John Fox, Coxswain – 1860
  Capt. Edward F. N. K. Wasey, RN, H.M. Coastguard – 1860 (Second-Service clasp)
  Capt. Edward F. N. K. Wasey, RN, H.M. Coastguard – 1860 (Third-Service clasp)
  William Swarbrick, Master of the Steam Tug Wyre – 1863
  Robert Gerrard, Pilot – 1863
  Robert Wright, Coxswain – 1890
  James Fogg, Master of the fishing smack Osprey – 1890
  George Wilkinson, crew member, Osprey – 1890
  Robert Wright, Coxswain – 1895 (Second-Service clasp)
  Jeffrey Wright, Coxswain – 1941
  Sydney Norman Hill, Mechanic – 1941
- RNLI Bronze Medal
  James Leadbetter, Coxswain – 1949
- 'The Thanks of the Institution inscribed on Vellum'
  James Leadbetter, Second Coxswain – 1941
  Richard Wright, Assistant Mechanic – 1941
  William Houston, crew member – 1941
  David Wright, crew member – 1941
  Stephen James Musgrave, Second Coxswain – 1984
  William Fairclough, Coxswain – 1987
- Vellum Service Certificate
  Barrie Farmer, crew member – 1984
  David Owen, crew member – 1984
- The Ralph Glister Award 1984
  (for the most meritorious service of the year performed by a rescue boat crew)
  Stephen James Musgrave, Helm – 1985
  Barrie Farmer, crew member – 1985
  David Owen, crew member – 1985
- Bronze Medal, awarded by the RSPCA
  Steve Carroll, Mechanic – 2005
- Member, Order of the British Empire (MBE)
  Christopher Hurst, Coxswain – 2009QBH

== Roll of honour ==
In memory of those lost whilst serving at Fleetwood.

- Two crew of the fishing smack Osprey drowned, attempting to rescue the three crew of the schooner Jean Campbell, 7 November 1890
  James Abram (24)
  George Greenall (25)
- Received serious injuries to his arm during the launch of the lifeboat on 13 April, and died on 4 June 1945.
  William Wright, Head launcher (73)

== Fleetwood lifeboats ==
=== Fleetwood / Fleetwood No. 1 ===
| ON (Note: ON is the RNLI's Official Number of the boat.) | Name | Built | On station | Class | Comments |
|---|---|---|---|---|---|
| Pre-340 | Unnamed | 1859 | 1859−1862 | 30-foot Peake self-righting (P&S) | (Note: 30 ft 0 in (9.14 m) x 6 ft 3 in (1.91 m) (6-oared) Peake-class self-righting (P&S) lifeboat, built by Forrestt of Limehouse, London, costing £153.); Transferred to Fishguard. |
| Pre-396 | Edward Wasey | 1862 | 1862−1879 | 32-foot Peake self-righting (P&S) | (Note: 32 ft 0 in (9.75 m) x 7 ft 11 in (2.41 m) (10-oared) Peake-class self-righting (P&S) lifeboat, gift of Miss M. Wasey of Newbury, Berkshire, built by Forrestt of Limehouse, London, costing £166.); Broken up in 1879. |
| Pre-643 | Child of Hale | 1879 | 1879−1887 | 34-foot self-righting (P&S) | (Note: 34 ft 0 in (10.36 m) x 8 ft 8 in (2.64 m) (10-oared) self-righting (P&S) lifeboat, gift of Miss Mary Wasey of Newbury, Berkshire, built by Woolfe of Shadwell, London, costing £363.); Broken up in 1887. |
| 75 | Child of Hale | 1877 | 1887−1893 | 37-foot self-righting (P&S) | (Note: 37 ft 0 in (11.28 m) x 8 ft 0 in (2.44 m) (12-oared) self-righting (P&S) lifeboat, gift of Col. W. Blackburne of Leamington, built by Woolfe of Shadwell, London, costing £393 when new.); Previously unnamed reserve lifeboat. Sold in 1892. |
| 76 | Edith | 1884 | 1887−1894 | 46-foot self-righting (P&S) | (Note: 46 ft 0 in (14.02 m) x 11 ft 0 in (3.35 m) self-righting (P&S) lifeboat, gift of Mrs G. Carew, built by Woolfe of Shadwell, London, costing £583 when new.); Previously unnamed at New Brighton. Fleetwood No.2 lifeboat (1887–1893). Sold in 1894 |
| 359 | Maude Pickup | 1894 | 1894−1930 | 43-foot Watson (P&S) | |

Station closed for reconstruction, 1930–1933
Pre ON numbers are unofficial numbers used by the Lifeboat Enthusiasts' Society to reference early lifeboats not included on the official RNLI list.

=== Motor lifeboats ===
| ON | Op.No. (Note: Op.No. is the RNLI's Operational Number carried on the hull or vehicle.) | Name | Built | On station | Class | Comments |
|---|---|---|---|---|---|---|
| 628 | − | Sir Fitzroy Clayton | 1912 | 1933−1935 | 38-foot self-righting (motor) | (Note: 38 ft 0 in (11.58 m) x 9 ft 9 in (2.97 m) self-righting (motor) lifeboat, with a single 35-hp 'Tylor' petrol engine, built by Thames Ironworks of Blackwall, London, costing £3,081.); Previously at Newhaven and The Lizard. Sold in 1935. Renamed La Moye. Houseboat, broken up at Bowness in 1986. |
| 657 | − | Frederick H. Pilley | 1920 | 1935−1939 | 38-foot self-righting (motor) | (Note: 38 ft 0 in (11.58 m) x 9 ft 9 in (2.97 m) self-righting (motor) lifeboat, gift of Mr F. H. Pilley, with a single 45-hp 'Tylor' petrol engine, built by Summers and Payne of Southampton, completed by S. E. Saunders of Cowes, costing £5,592.); Previously at The Lizard and Islay. Sold in 1939. Renamed Anzac, Seaspell, Ladybird and Natalie. Damaged by fire at Stockton-on-Tees, September 1992. |
| 813 | − | Ann Letitia Russell | 1938 | 1939−1976 | 41-foot Watson | |
| 1036 | 44-015 | Lady of Lancashire | 1974 | 1976−1989 | Waveney | Transferred to Dún Laoghaire |
| 1156 | 47-038 | William Street | 1989 | 1989−2016 | Tyne | |
| 1321 | 13-14 | Kenneth James Pierpoint | 2016 | 2016− | Shannon | |

More post-service details can be found on the respective lifeboat class pages.

=== Inshore lifeboats ===
| Op.No. | Name | On station | Class | Comments |
|---|---|---|---|---|
| D-91 | Unnamed | 1966−1970 | D-class (RFD PB16) | |
| D-187 | Unnamed | 1970−1984 | D-class (RFD PB16) | |
| D-298 | Unnamed | 1984−1992 | D-class (RFD PB16) | |
| D-424 | City of Chester | 1992−2000 | D-class (EA16) | |
| D-556 | Saddleworth | 2000−2009 | D-class (EA16) | |
| D-719 | Mary Elizabeth Barnes | 2009−2021 | D-class (IB1) | |
| D-853 | Harbet | 2021− | D-class (IB1) | |

== See also ==
- List of RNLI stations
- List of former RNLI stations
- Royal National Lifeboat Institution lifeboats
