= List of shipwrecks in February 1870 =

The list of shipwrecks in February 1870 includes ships sunk, foundered, grounded, or otherwise lost during February 1870.

== 1 February ==
List of shipwrecks: 1 February 1870
Ship	State	Description
Brunette	United States	During a voyage from New York City to Philadelphia, Pennsylvania, the 274-gross register ton steam screw cargo ship sank with the loss of two lives six minutes after colliding with the steamer Santiago de Cuba (flag unknown) in the North Atlantic Ocean off Point Pleasant Beach, New Jersey, in 75 feet (23 m) of water. There were 11 survivors. Brunette's wreck is known as the "Doorknob Wreck."
Cruizer	United Kingdom	The paddle tug was driven ashore in Porlock Bay. Her crew survived.
Danube	United Kingdom	The ship caught fire at Jersey, Channel Islands.
Hygeia	United Kingdom	The barque was severely damaged by fire at Ancona, Papal States.
Jenny	United Kingdom	The ship collided with the brig Maria (United Kingdom) and sank off Spurn Head, Yorkshire. She was on a voyage from Thisted, Denmark to Hull, Yorkshire.
Louisa Ann Fanny	United Kingdom	The steamship ran aground at Gothenburg, Sweden. She was on a voyage from London to Gothenburg. She was refloated.
Mellna	Hamburg	The ship was abandoned. Her crew were rescued by Embla (Norway). Mellna was on a voyage from Lisbon, Portugal to Hamburg. She was subsequently taken in tow by Antagonist (United Kingdom).
Rival	United Kingdom	The ship was sighted off the mouth of the River Plate whilst on a voyage from Buenos Aires, Argentina to an English port. No further trace, presumed foundered with the loss of all hands.
Sheffield	United Kingdom	The steamship sank at Rotterdam, South Holland, Netherlands. She was refloated.
William	United Kingdom	The ship was driven ashore at Saltfleet, Lincolnshire. She was on a voyage from London to Selby, Yorkshire.
Zenobe	United Kingdom	The ship was driven ashore near Kirkcudbright. She was on a voyage from Nantes, Loire-Inférieure, France to Kirkcudbright.

== 2 February ==
List of shipwrecks: 2 February 1870
Ship	State	Description
Britannia	United Kingdom	The ship was severely damaged by fire at London.
Helen Scott	United Kingdom	The ship was driven ashore at Aberdeen. Her crew were rescued by the Aberdeen Lifeboat. She was on a voyage from Amble, Northumberland to Aberdeen.
Marwell	New Zealand	The 28-ton cutter hit rocks near Tiritiri Matangi Island in the Hauraki Gulf while laden with kauri gum and timber.
Navita	Newfoundland Colony	The ship was wrecked at Head's Harbour. She was on a voyage from Saint John's to Havana, Cuba.
Olive M. Rourke	Canada	The ship was abandoned in the Atlantic Ocean. She was on a voyage from Saint John, New Brunswick to Wexford, United Kingdom. She was towed in to Santa Maria Island, Azores on 28 May by Moshesh (France).
River Jumna	United Kingdom	The ship departed from Newcastle, New South Wales for San Francisco, California, United States. No further trace presumed foundered with the loss of all hands.
Ystavet	United Kingdom	The ship put in to Penang, Straits Settlements on fire. She was on a voyage from Hull, Yorkshire to Rangoon, Burma.

== 3 February ==
List of shipwrecks: 3 February 1870
Ship	State	Description
Eliza	United Kingdom	The ship foundered in the English Channel off Elbury Point, Devon. Her crew were rescued. She was on a voyage from Antwerp, Belgium to La Rochelle, Charente-Inférieure, France.
Flora	United Kingdom	The brigantine ran aground on the Barnard Sand. Her eight crew were rescued. She was on a voyage from Lisbon, Portugal to Hull, Yorkshire.
Lady Cartier	United Kingdom	The ship sprang a leak and was beached at Falmouth, Cornwall. She was on a voyage from South Shields, County Durham to New Orleans, Louisiana, United States.
Malika	United Kingdom	The schooner was abandoned. Her crew were rescued by Embla (Norway). Malika was on a voyage from Lisbon, Portugal to Hamburg. She was towed in to Dartmouth, Devon by the tug Guide (United Kingdom).
Martha	(Dominion of Newfoundland) Newfoundland Colony	The ship was wrecked at Brandon, County Kerry, United Kingdom. Her eight crew were rescued by a pilot boat. She was on a voyage from Saint John's to Bristol, Gloucestershire, United Kingdom.
No-name	United Kingdom	The ship was driven ashore in Liscannor Bay.
Sarah Hughes	United Kingdom	The schooner was driven ashore near Warrenpoint, County Down.
Transit	United Kingdom	The ship ran aground at Liverpool, Lancashire. She was on a voyage from Liverpool to Boston, Massachusetts, United States. She was refloated.
Waterlily	United Kingdom	The abandoned barque came ashore and was wrecked 20 nautical miles (37 km) north of Cabo Mondego, Portugal. She had been on a voyage from Cardiff, Glamorgan to Bombay, India. Her crew were presumed to have been lost.

== 4 February ==
List of shipwrecks: 4 February 1870
Ship	State	Description
Artemis	Greece	The brig was holed by ice and sank at Brăila, Ottoman Empire.
Advance, and Ashford	United Kingdom	The steamship Ashford collided with the steamship Advance (United Kingdom) and sank off Whitby, Yorkshire. Her crew were rescued by Advance, which subsequently sank off Ryhope, County Durham. All on board Advance were rescued by the tug Fiery Cross (United Kingdom).
Elize	France	The brigantine was wrecked in Tor Bay. Her crew were rescued. She was on a voyage from Antwerp, Belgium to La Rochelle, Charente-Inférieure.
Flamingo	United Kingdom	The ship was abandoned in the Atlantic Ocean 200 nautical miles (370 km) off the coast of County Clare with the loss of two of her four crew. She was on a voyage from Africa to Liverpool, Lancashire.
Florence Pope	United Kingdom	The brig was wrecked on Cape Clear Island, County Cork with the loss of two of her four crew. She was on a voyage from Lagos, Africa to Liverpool.
Hurry Seedee	India	The ship was abandoned in the Indian Ocean in a sinking condition. Her crew were rescued by William Fairburn (United Kingdom). Hurry Seedee was on a voyage from Calcutta to the Maldive Islands.
Luther	United Kingdom	The ship collided with Bonny (United Kingdom) and sank in the Sloyne. She was on a voyage from Poole, Dorset to Runcorn, Cheshire.
Mary	United Kingdom	The ship was driven ashore and wrecked at Pittenweem, Fife.
Unnamed	Flag unknown	The ship was wrecked at Kingsbridge, Devon, United Kingdom with loss of life.

== 5 February ==
List of shipwrecks: 5 February 1870
Ship	State	Description
Petrino Palazo	Italy	The schooner was driven ashore near Lagos, Portugal. She was on a voyage from Brăila, Ottoman Empire to Falmouth, Cornwall, United Kingdom.

== 6 February ==
List of shipwrecks: 6 February 1870
Ship	State	Description
Active	United Kingdom	The brig was driven ashore and wrecked at Duncansby Head, Caithness with the loss of all six crew. She was on a voyage from Wick, Caithness to a Norwegian port.
Eureka	(United Kingdom of Great Britain and Ireland) Guernsey	The brig was driven ashore and wrecked at Dartmouth, Devon with the loss of three of her nine crew. She was on a voyage from Newcastle upon Tyne, Northumberland to Plymouth, Devon.
Eva	United Kingdom	The schooner was driven ashore and wrecked at Banff, Aberdeenshire with the loss of one of her six crew.
Harriette	United Kingdom	The ship sprang a leak and was beached at Swansea, Glamorgan. Her crew were rescued. She was on a voyage from Portmadoc, Caernarfonshire to Gloucester.
Hebes	United Kingdom	The schooner ran ashore and was wrecked at Flamborough Head, Yorkshire. She was on a voyage from King's Lynn, Norfolk to Newcastle upon Tyne.
Hero	United Kingdom	The smack was driven ashore and wrecked at Withernsea, Yorkshire. Her crew were rescued by the Coastguard.
John Bell	United Kingdom	The schooner was abandoned off Ramsey, Isle of Man. Her crew were rescued by the Ramsey Lifeboat. She was on a voyage from Red Bay, Ireland to Barrow in Furness, Lancashire.
Medea	United Kingdom	The brig ran ashore at Flamborough Head. She was on a voyage from Poole, Dorset to Newcastle upon Tyne. She was refloated on 15 February and taken in to Bridlington.
Toni	Austria-Hungary	The brig was driven ashore and wrecked at Bridlington, Yorkshire. She was on a voyage from Alexandria, Egypt to Hull, Yorkshire.

== 7 February ==
List of shipwrecks: 7 February 1870
Ship	State	Description
America	United Kingdom	The barque ran aground on the Oaze Sand, in the Thames Estuary. She was on a voyage from London to the West Indies. She was refloated and put back to London.
Antias	United Kingdom	The brig was driven ashore at Hartlepool, County Durham.
Brownlow	United Kingdom	The steamship ran aground on the Middlegrund, in the Baltic Sea. She was on a voyage from Danzig to an English port. She was refloated on 17 February.
Elizabeth A. Bird	United Kingdom	The ship was driven ashore in Dundrum Bay. She was on a voyage from Liverpool, Lancashire to Africa. She was later refloated and taken in to Belfast, County Antrim.
Hebe	United Kingdom	The brig ran aground on the North Sand, in the North Sea.
Janette	United Kingdom	The steamship was driven ashore near Sligo. She was on a voyage from Oyster Island, County Sligo to Sligo.
Marion	United Kingdom	The ship was driven ashore near Saltfleet, Lincolnshire. She was on a voyage from Rochester, Kent to Hull, Yorkshire.
Oregon	United Kingdom	The ship was wrecked on the Cournanisi Rock, off Cape St. Angelo, Ottoman Empire. Her sixteen crew survived. She was on a voyage from Angostura to Cartagena, Spain.
Orestes	United Kingdom	The brig was damaged by fire at Hartlepool.
Pilot	United Kingdom	The brig was driven ashore and wrecked at Hartlepool. Her eight crew were rescued by the West Hartlepool Lifeboat.
Pool	United Kingdom	The brig ran aground on the North Sand.
Unnamed	Norway	A schooner was wrecked off Duncansby Head, Caithness, United Kingdom; there were no survivors.

== 8 February ==
List of shipwrecks: 8 February 1870
Ship	State	Description
Admiral	United Kingdom	The smack was driven ashore and wrecked at Great Yarmouth, Norfolk. Her crew were rescued by the Great Yarmouth Lifeboat.
Adret	United Kingdom	The ship was driven ashore on Inchcolm, Fife. She was on a voyage from Grangemouth, Stirlingshire to Constantinople, Ottoman Empire. She subsequently floated off and ran aground on the Drum Sands. She was taken in to Granton, Lothian on 5 March in a capsized condition.
Albion	United Kingdom	The schooner was driven ashore at Hartlepool, County Durham. She was refloated with the assistance of three tugs and taken in to Hartlepool.
Aurora	United Kingdom	The schooner was driven ashore 1 nautical mile (1.9 km) south of Southwold, Suffolk. She was on a voyage from Gravelines, Nord to Ipswich, Suffolk.
Biago Asserto	Flag unknown	The ship ran aground at the entrance to Lough Foyle.
Dasso	United Kingdom	The ship foundered in the North Sea 70 nautical miles (130 km) north west of Heligoland with the loss of six of her crew. She was on a voyage from Sunderland, County Durham to Hamburg.
Emma	United Kingdom	The schooner struck the Mussel Craig, off Collieston, Aberdeenshire and was wrecked with the loss of all on board.
Freden	(Russian Empire) Grand Duchy of Finland	The barque was wrecked on the Isle of Lewis, Outer Hebrides, United Kingdom. She was on a voyage from South Shields, County Durham to Cagliari, Sardinia, Italy.
Helena	United Kingdom	The barque was wrecked on the Black Middens, in the North Sea off the coast of County Durham. Her fourteen crew were rescued by the South Shields Lifeboat Northumberland ( Royal National Lifeboat Institution). Helena was on a voyage from the River Tyne to Pará, Brazil.
Henry	Norway	The brigantine was wrecked on Sanday, Orkney Islands, United Kingdom with the loss of seven of her ten crew.
Herbert Birch	United Kingdom	The ship ran aground at Warrenpoint, County Antrim.
Hutoka	United Kingdom	The ship departed from Falmouth, Cornwall for Hamburg. No further trace, presumed foundered with the loss of all hands.
Kate	United Kingdom	The ship put in to Hartlepool, where she sank. She was on a voyage from Great Yarmouth, Norfolk to Seaham, County Durham.
Lady Clarke	United Kingdom	The ship was driven ashore at Adra, Spain.
Light of the Harem, or Pride of the Harem	United Kingdom	The schooner was driven ashore and wrecked at Tynemouth, Northumberland. Her five crew were rescued by rocket apparatus.
Margheramore	United Kingdom	The ship sprang a leak, caught fire and was destroyed. She was on a voyage from Larne, County Antrim to Stranraer, Wigtownshire.
Martha Lloyd	United Kingdom	The ship was driven ashore at Harwich, Essex. She was on a voyage from Pomaron, Portugal to Ipswich. She was refloated with assistance from the smack Alfred, the paddle tug Reaper and the yawl Trio (all United Kingdom).
Mary	United Kingdom	The ship was driven ashore and wrecked at Silloth, Cumberland.
Mary Stewart	United Kingdom	The ship was driven ashore near Campbeltown, Argyllshire.
Onward	United Kingdom	The ship ran aground in Lough Foyle.
Panope	United Kingdom	The schooner was driven ashore at Middleton, County Durham. Her crew were rescued.
Paquita	Spain	The barque was lost off "Gunabo Point".
Parnaby	United Kingdom	The brigantine ran aground on the Middleton Sand, off the coast of County Durham.
Peacock	United Kingdom	The brig struck the pier at Blyth, Northumberland and was beached. Her crew were rescued. She was on a voyage from Boulogne, Pas-de-Calais, France to Blyth.
Star of Ind	United Kingdom	The schooner was driven ashore and wrecked at Great Yarmouth. Her crew were rescued. She was on a voyage from King's Lynn, Norfolk to London.
Sundew	United Kingdom	The ship was wrecked on Coquet Island, Northumberland.
Susan Ann	United Kingdom	The ship ran aground on the Herd Sand, in the North Sea off the coast of County Durham.
Susannah	United Kingdom	The schooner was wrecked on the Black Middens with the loss of one of her five crew. Survivors were rescued by rocket apparatus, but a rescuer lost his life. She was on a voyage from Seaham, County Durham to London.
Tasso	United Kingdom	The steamship sprang a leak and foundered in the North Sea 70 nautical miles (130 km) off Heligoland with the loss of six of her 21 crew. Survivors were rescued by the smack Elbe (Bremen). Tasso was on a voyage from Sunderland, County Durham to Hamburg.
Troubadour	United Kingdom	The barque ran aground on the Brake Sand, off the east Kent coast. She was refloated.

== 9 February ==
List of shipwrecks: 9 February 1870
Ship	State	Description
Aurora	United Kingdom	The ship was wrecked on the Gunfleet Sand, in the North Sea off the coast of Essex. Her eight crew were rescued. She was on a voyage from Sunderland, County Durham to London.
Bessie Mitchell	United Kingdom	The schooner was run down and sunk off Lundy Island, Devon by the brig Volage (United Kingdom). Her crew survived. Bessie Mitchell was on a voyage from Briton Ferry, Glamorgan to Southampton, Hampshire.
Jacana	United Kingdom	The steamship was wrecked on the Longsand, in the North Sea off the coast of Essex. Her crew were rescued by the fishing smacks Mary Ann and Rapid (both United Kingdom). Jacana was on her maiden voyage, from Newcastle upon Tyne, Northumberland to Cork.
Mary Walker	Canada	The schooner was wrecked at Southwest Harbor, Maine, United States.

== 10 February ==
List of shipwrecks: 10 February 1870
Ship	State	Description
Junon	France	The lugger foundered 5 nautical miles (9.3 km) north east of St. Ives, Cornwall, United Kingdom. Her crew were rescued by a British steamship. She was on a voyage from Swansea, Glamorgan, United Kingdom to Pont-Audemer, Eure.
Maggie Hayes	United States	The steamship suffered a boiler explosion at Helena, Louisiana with the loss of ten lives. She was on a voyage from New Orleans, Louisiana to Pittsburgh, Pennsylvania.
Renown	United Kingdom	The barque was wrecked in the Sir Edward Pellew Group of Islands, Northern Territory, South Australia. Her crew were rescued. She was on a voyage from Bangkok, Siam to Yokohama, Japan.

== 11 February ==
List of shipwrecks: 11 February 1870
Ship	State	Description
Alert	Norway	The schooner was driven ashore and wrecked on the Drum Sand, in the Firth of Forth off Burntisland, Fife, United Kingdom. Her crew survived.
Bluebell	United Kingdom	The ship was driven ashore near Warrenpoint, County Down. She was on a voyage from Troon, Ayrshire to Warrenpoint. She was refloated and towed in to Warrenpoint.
Carmela	Malta	The ship was wrecked at Mogador, Morocco. Her crew were rescued.
Dordrecht	Netherlands	The ship capsized and was severely damaged.
Edith May	United Kingdom	The ship departed from Swansea, Glamorgan for Cádiz, Spain. No further trace, presumed foundered with the loss of all hands.
Hermit	United Kingdom	The ship departed from Cardiff, Glamorgan for Gibraltar. No further trace, presumed foundered with the loss of all hands.

== 12 February ==
List of shipwrecks: 12 February 1870
Ship	State	Description
Advance	United Kingdom	The ship was abandoned in the Atlantic Ocean. Her crew were rescued by Sylvanus Blanchard (United States). Advance was on a voyage from Callao, Peru to Antwerp, Belgium.
Anna Lena	Netherlands	The brig was driven ashore and wrecked at Walmer, Kent, United Kingdom. Her crew were rescued. She was on a voyage from Surinam to Amsterdam, North Holland.
Courser	United Kingdom	The schooner was driven ashore near Dartmouth, Devon with the loss of five of her six crew. She was on a voyage from Fécamp, Seine-Inférieure, France to Torbay, Devon.
Eglantine	United Kingdom	The barque was driven ashore at Walmer. Her crew were rescued. She was on a voyage from Alexandria, Egypt to Dover, Kent.
Falcon	United Kingdom	The ship departed from Tripoli, Vilayet of Tripolitania for a British port. No further trace, presumed foundered with the loss of all hands.
Glendower	United Kingdom	The ship was driven ashore at Kingsdown, Kent. All on board were rescued by local boatsmen, the Coastguard and the Kingsdown Lifeboat Sabrina ( Royal National Lifeboat Institution). Glendower was on a voyage from Java, Netherlands East Indies to Rotterdam, South Holland, Netherlands. She was refloated on 19 February and taken in tow for London.
Hillechiena Amalia	Netherlands	The ship was driven ashore at the mouth of the Rhône. She was on a voyage from Genoa, Italy to Cette, Hérault, France.
James Evans	United Kingdom	The smack was driven ashore and sank at Donna Nook, Lincolnshire.
Racine	France	The schooner was driven ashore at Walmer with the loss of a crew member. She was on a voyage from Havana, Cuba to Antwerp, Belgium.
Richard	United Kingdom	The schooner was run ashore at Wicklow. She was on a voyage from Ipswich, Suffolk to Wicklow.
Sheffield	United Kingdom	The steamship ran aground at Dordrecht, South Holland, Netherlands.
Triton	United Kingdom	The ship was wrecked on the Loup Garon Shoal, off Martinique. Her crew were rescued. She was on a voyage from London to Saint Helena and/or Saint Lucia.
Ursus Minor	Norway	The brig was driven ashore at Bridlington, Yorkshire, United Kingdom. Her crew were rescued. She was on a voyage from Kragerø, Norway to Grimsby, Lincolnshire.
Two unnamed vessels	United Kingdom	The schooners were driven ashore at Binstead, Isle of Wight, United Kingdom.

== 13 February ==
List of shipwrecks: 13 February 1870
Ship	State	Description
Alladin	United Kingdom	The ship was wrecked at Huelva, Spain. Her crew were rescued.
Angelica	Romania	The brig was driven ashore at Portland. She was on a voyage from Antwerp, Belgium to Syra, Greece or Galaţi, Romania. She floated off on 25 February and drove against the breakwater.
Betsey	United Kingdom	The schooner was driven ashore at Portland, Dorset.
Bowes	United Kingdom	The ship was driven ashore and wrecked at Kilnsea, Yorkshire. Her crew were rescued. She was on a voyage from Sunderland, County Durham to London.
Giovannino A.	Austria-Hungary	The brig (also reported as Johanna), at anchor from Venice, broke free in a gale and was wrecked at Gorleston, Suffolk, United Kingdom. Her crew were rescued by lifeboat, assisted by rocket apparatus.
Glenmore	United Kingdom	The ship was driven ashore at Wexford. Her crew survived She was on a voyage from Wexford to Cardiff, Glamorgan.
Maude Annie	United Kingdom	The ship was driven ashore at Wexford. Her crew survived. She was on a voyage from Wexford to Newport, Monmouthshire. She was refloated on 23 February and taken in to Wexford.
Saint Cyran	United Kingdom	The schooner dragged anchors and was driven ashore and wrecked at Great Yarmouth, Norfolk. Her crew of nine were rescued by the Great Yarmouth lifeboat. She was on a voyage from South Shields to Martinique with coal.
Scotia	United Kingdom	The schooner was driven ashore at Caernarfon. Her crew were rescued by the Caernarfon lifeboat John Gray Bell ( Royal National Lifeboat Institution). Scotia was on a voyage from Dublin to Caernarfon. She floated off the next day and drove out to sea. She was taken in to Porthdinllaen, Caernarfonshire.
Sea Queen	United Kingdom	The steamship struck the Barnard Sand and consequently foundered in the North Sea off the Cockle Lightship ( Trinity House) with the loss of all 24 crew. She was on a voyage from South Shields, County Durham to Málaga, Spain.
Temperance	United Kingdom	The ship was run ashore at Penarth, Glamorgan.
Vesta	United Kingdom	The ship was run ashore at Penarth.
Victoria	United Kingdom	The barque, North Shields, Northumberland for Barcelona, was driven ashore at Gorleston and completely wrecked; only five of a supposed crew of 16-18 survived.
William Harper	United Kingdom	The barque, from Burriana and anchored for orders, was driven ashore and wrecked at Walmer. Her crew were rescued.
Unnamed	United Kingdom	The ship was driven ashore and wrecked at Great Yarmouth. Her eighteen crew were rescued by rocket apparatus.

== 14 February ==
List of shipwrecks: 14 February 1870
Ship	State	Description
Admiral Nelson	(United Kingdom of Great Britain and Ireland) Guernsey	The schooner struck the Corton Sand, in the North Sea off the coast of Suffolk and became leaky. She was subsequently driven against the pier and sank at Lowestoft, Suffolk. Her crew were rescued. Admiral Nelson was on a voyage from Newcastle upon Tyne, Northumberland to Cherbourg, Seine-Inférieure, France.
Adventure	United Kingdom	The collier, a brig, was driven ashore at Queenstown, County Cork or Kingstown, County Dublin.
Ajax	United Kingdom	The ship was driven ashore in Studland Bay.
Ann Mitchell	United Kingdom	The brig ran aground at Harwich, Essex. She was on a voyage from Dundee, Forfarshire to Palermo, Sicily, Italy. She was refloated but had to be beached at Shotley, Suffolk.
Bawes	United Kingdom	The brig foundered off Spurn Point, Yorkshire. Her seven crew survived. She was on a voyage from Sunderland, County Durham to London.
Bethell	United Kingdom	The smack was driven ashore at Lowestoft. Her five crew were rescued by the Lowestoft Lifeboat Bradford ( Royal National Lifeboat Institution).
Chance It	United Kingdom	The ship was destroyed by fire in the North Sea. Her crew were rescued.
Eleferotreo	Greece	The schooner was driven ashore near "Bari", on the east coast of Sardinia, Italy. Her crew were rescued. She was on a voyage from Galaţi, Ottoman Empire to Manila, Spanish East Indies.
Elizabeth Ray	United Kingdom	The ship was abandoned off Corton, Suffolk. Her eight crew were rescued by the Gorleston Lifeboat Leicester ( Royal National Lifeboat Institution). Elizabeth Ray was subsequently reboarded by four of her crew who sailed south, intending to put in to Harwich, Essex.
Favourite	United Kingdom	The schooner was driven ashore at Great Yarmouth with the loss of one of her five crew. Survivors were rescued by the Great Yarmouth Lifeboat Duff ( Royal National Lifeboat Institution). Favourite was on a voyage from Arbroath, Forfarshire to London.
Favourite	United Kingdom	The brig was driven ashore and sank at Kingstown, County Dublin. She was on a voyage from Whitehaven, Cumberland to Cardiff, Glamorgan.
Fratelli Uniti	Italy	The ship foundered in the Atlantic Ocean. Her crew were rescued. She was on a voyage from the Black Sea to Falmouth, Cornwall, United Kingdom.
Four Brothers	United Kingdom	The ship was driven ashore in Studland Bay.
George	United Kingdom	The ship sank at Scarborough, Yorkshire.
Glaneuse	France	The ship was driven ashore at Gravelines, Nord. Her crew were rescued.
John Herman	United Kingdom	The ship was driven ashore at Dungeness, Kent. Her crew were rescued. She was on a voyage from Riga, Russia to Antwerp, Belgium.
Lucy	(United Kingdom of Great Britain and Ireland) Isle of Man	The ship was driven ashore at Caerhays Castle, Cornwall with the loss of two of her seven crew. Four of her crew were rescued by the Coastguard. Her captain refused to leave the vessel.
Mary	United Kingdom	The smack was wrecked in the Cud Channel. Her crew were rescued by the Ramsgate Lifeboat.
Mira, or Riva	(Canada)	The ship was wrecked on the Outer Dowsing Sandbank, in the North Sea off the coast of Norfolk with the loss of nine of her eleven crew. She was on a voyage from a port in Nova Scotia, Canada to South Shields, County Durham, or from South Shields to London and/or New York, United States. Also reported as Riva, on a voyage from South Shields to Boston, Massachusetts, United States with ten crew and a pilot on board.
Ocean Spray	United Kingdom	The ship released a message in a bottle on this date stating that she was in a sinking condition. The bottle came ashore on the coast of Nairnshire in mid-April.
Peleta	Spain	The barque was abandoned in the Atlantic Ocean (39°48′N 13°30′W). Her eleven crew were rescued by Briton (United Kingdom). Peleta was on a voyage from Cádiz to Bilbao.
Primus	United Kingdom	The steamship ran aground at Lowestoft whilst evading a collision with the barque Victoria (United Kingdom). She was on a voyage from South Shields to London. She was refloated and assisted in to Lowestoft.
Prince Albert	United Kingdom	The brig ran aground and was wrecked at Great Yarmouth. Her crew were rescued. She was on a voyage from Newcastle upon Tyne to Dieppe, Seine-Inférieure.
Robert Nicol	United Kingdom	The brig was abandoned in the Atlantic Ocean 60 nautical miles (110 km) south west of the Isles of Scilly. Her crew were rescued by the barque Azow (Norway). Robert Nicol was on a voyage from Swansea, Glamorgan to Dieppe.
The Queen	United Kingdom	The barque foundered in the North Sea off Cromer, Norfolk, according to a message in a bottle that washed up on the Norfolk coast on 24 February.
Union	United Kingdom	The schooner was driven ashore at Wicklow. Her crew were rescued. She was on a voyage from Newport, Monmouthshire to Ardrossan, Ayrshire.
Zemidar	United Kingdom	The ship ran aground at Dumbarton.

== 15 February ==
List of shipwrecks: 15 February 1870
Ship	State	Description
Adele	France	The ship was abandoned in the Atlantic Ocean 60 leagues (180 nautical miles (330 km) off Ouessant, Finistère. Her crew were rescued. Her crew were rescued by Caton (United Kingdom). Adele was on a voyage from Newport, Monmouthshire, United Kingdom to Auray, Morbihan.
Adolphus	United Kingdom	The ship was driven ashore at Portland, Dorset.
Confucius	China	The steamship ran aground on a rock in the Yangtze and was wrecked.
Cynthia	United Kingdom	The ship was driven ashore at Portland.
Hengist	United Kingdom	The ship was driven ashore at Portland.
Hope	United Kingdom	The smack collided with the smack Vesta (United Kingdom) and sank off Penarth, Glamorgan. She was on a voyage from Cardiff to Penarth.
Kate	United Kingdom	The ship ran aground at Kirkcaldy, Fife.
Liberté	Belgium	The brig collided with the Bull Lightship ( Trinity House) and was severely damaged at the bow. She was assisted in to Grimsby, Lincolnshire, United Kingdom.
Marie Amélie	France	The ship was wrecked on Belle Île, Morbihan. She was on a voyage from Réunion to Nantes, Loire-Inférieure.
Mersey	United Kingdom	The Mersey Flat collided with the steamship Marathon (United Kingdom) and sank in the River Mersey. Both crew were rescued by Marathon. Mersey was on a voyage from Liverpool, Lancashire to Tranmere, Cheshire. She subsequently floated and was beached at Liverpool with assistance from the tug Hercules (United Kingdom).
Rosetta	United Kingdom	The brig capsized at Stockton-on-Tees, County Durham.
St. Stephen's	United Kingdom	The ship ran aground at Cove, County Cork.
Terschelling	Netherlands	The schooner was driven ashore between Weymouth and Portland. She was on a voyage from Bahia, Brazil to London, United Kingdom.
Trye	Norway	The barque ran aground on the Nore. She was on a voyage from Kristiansand to London, United Kingdom. She was refloated and towed in the River Thames in a waterlogged condition.
Vedra	United Kingdom	The brig was wrecked in the Farne Islands, Northumberland. Her crew were rescued by a Norwegian schooner.
William Green	United Kingdom	The pilot cutter was wrecked near Cardiff, Glamorgan.
Zuma	(United Kingdom of Great Britain and Ireland) Guernsey	The brig was driven ashore at Saint Sampson.

== 16 February ==
List of shipwrecks: 16 February 1870
Ship	State	Description
Grand Frederic	France	The ship was abandoned in the Atlantic Ocean. Her crew were rescued. She was on a voyage from Saint-Malo, Ille-et-Vilaine to Swansea, Glamorgan, United Kingdom.
Lady Sale	United Kingdom	The brig was beached at Hartlepool, County Durham and subsequently became a wreck. She was on a voyage from Sunderland, County Durham to Lowestoft, Suffolk.
Messenger	United Kingdom	The ship ran aground on the Shipwash Sand, in the North Sea off the coast of Suffolk. She was on a voyage from Harwich, Essex to Galway. She was refloated with assistance and resumed her voyage.
Prebislaw	Rostock	The ship ran aground in the Shetland Islands, United Kingdom. She was on a voyage from Kristiansand, Norway to Sunderland, County Durham, United Kingdom. She was refloated and taken in to Lerwick, Shetland Islands in a leaky condition.
Queen of the Isles	United Kingdom	The steamship was wrecked on the Brest Rocks, on the coast of Ayrshire. She was on a voyage from a voyage from Whitehaven, Cumberland to Troon, Ayrshire.
Skerryvore	United Kingdom	The ship ran aground at Odesa, Russia.
Undine	United States	The brig was destroyed by fire at Rotterdam, South Holland, Netherlands. She was on a voyage from New York to Rotterdam.
William	United Kingdom	The brig ran aground on the Sandhald, in the North Sea off the coast of Lincolnshire. She was refloated and assisted in to Grimsby, Lincolnshire in a sinking condition.

== 17 February ==
List of shipwrecks: 17 February 1870
Ship	State	Description
Clara	Sweden	The schooner was abandoned. Her crew were rescued. She was on a voyage from Hartlepool, County Durham, United Kingdom to Malmö.
Frunhjelm	Flag unknown	The barque ran aground on the Nore. She was refloated with assistance from a tug.
Ida	United Kingdom	The schooner was driven ashore and wrecked at Cape Orlando, Sicily, Italy. She was on a voyage from Liverpool, Lancashire to Bari, Italy.
Magdalene Caroline	Wismar	The ship was abandoned in the North Sea 50 nautical miles (93 km) off the Isle of May, Fife, United Kingdom. Her crew were rescued. She was on a voyage from Hartlepool to Wismar.
Seine and Tamise No. 1	France	The ship struck piles at Fécamp, Seine-Inférieure and was damaged. She was on a voyage from Pará, Brazil to London.
St. Stephens	United Kingdom	The ship ran aground a Padstow, Cornwall and was damaged.
Trieste	United Kingdom	The steamship ran aground at Vlissingen, Zeeland, Netherlands. She was on a voyage from Gibraltar to Rotterdam, South Holland, Netherlands. She was refloated and taken in to the Niewu Diep.
Vision	United Kingdom	The schooner was driven ashore at Sunderland, County Durham. Her crew were rescued. She was on a voyage from Lossiemouth, Moray to Sunderland. She was refloated and taken in to Sunderland.
Volante	(United Kingdom of Great Britain and Ireland) Jersey	The smack collided with the steamship Forest Queen (United Kingdom) and sank at Swansea, Glamorgan. She was on a voyage from Bude, Cornwall to Swansea. She was refloated.

== 18 February ==
List of shipwrecks: 18 February 1870
Ship	State	Description
Alliance	Portugal	The ship was driven ashore at São Julião, Portugal. Her crew were rescued. She was on a voyage from Loanda, Portuguese West Africa to Lisbon, Portugal.
Aquila Meridana	Mexico	The schooner collided with the brigantine Fasel (Portugal) and was beached near Veracruz.
Emma No. 3	United States	The steamboat struck a snag in the Mississippi River near Island 35 and heeled over. A stove was upset and she was destroyed by fire with the loss of 70 lives. She was on a voyage from Memphis, Tennessee to Cincinnati, Ohio.
Hermione	United Kingdom	The ship departed from Matanzas, Cuba for the Clyde. No further trace, presumed foundered with the loss of all hands.
Sea Gull	United Kingdom	The ship ran aground on the Banjaard Sand, in the North Sea off the Dutch coast. Her crew were rescued. She was on a voyage from Vyborg, Grand Duchy of Finland to Antwerp, Belgium.
Spray	United Kingdom	The ship was damaged by fire at Cardiff, Glamorgan.

== 19 February ==
List of shipwrecks: 19 February 1870
Ship	State	Description
Elizabeth and Jane	United Kingdom	The schooner was driven ashore at the Fleetwood Lighthouse and was damaged. She was later refloated and taken in to Preston, Lancashire for repairs.
Fanny Louisa	New South Wales	The schooner collided with the steamship New England (New South Wales) and sank off Shoalhaven.
Flora	Flag unknown	The ship ran aground at Glückstadt, Prussia. She was on a voyage from Maracaibo, Venezuela to Glückstadt. She was refloated and towed in to Glüclstadt in a severely leaky condition.
Germ	United Kingdom	The ship capsized at "Whetton" and was wrecked.
Restless	United Kingdom	The barque was wrecked on Grand Cayman, Cayman Islands. She was on a voyage from Rio de Janeiro, Brazil to New Orleans, Louisiana, United States.
Venus	United Kingdom	The ship ran aground in the Clyde. She was on a voyage from the Clyde to Berbice, British Guiana. She was refloated on 23 February and taken in to Greenock, Renfrewshire.
William John	United Kingdom	The lighter sank at Belfast, County Antrim.

== 20 February ==
List of shipwrecks: 20 February 1870
Ship	State	Description
Black Prince	(United Kingdom of Great Britain and Ireland) Victoria	The steamship was wrecked at Kissing Point, Queensland.
Favourite	United Kingdom	The smack was driven ashore at Girvan, Ayrshire. Her crew were rescued. She was on a voyage from Carrickfergus, County Antrim to Girvan.
Germ	United Kingdom	The ship capsized in the River Ouse at Blacktoft, Yorkshire with the loss of her captain. She was on a voyage from Goole, Yorkshire to London.
Lavinia	United Kingdom	The coal hulk was run into by the steamship Cimbria (Hamburg) and sank at Plymouth, Devon.
Nalopa	Canada	The brig was wrecked at Johnstons Point, Nova Scotia. She was on a voyage from Saint Thomas, Virgin Islands to Liverpool, Nova Scotia.

== 21 February ==
List of shipwrecks: 21 February 1870
Ship	State	Description
Agnes Linck	Danzig	The ship ran aground off Skagen, Denmark.
Austicious	United Kingdom	The ship was driven ashore in the Farne Islands, Northumberland. She was refloated and subsequently put in to Scarborough, Yorkshire.
Hand of Providence	United Kingdom	The ship was driven ashore and sank at Saltfleet, Lincolnshire. She was on a voyage from Goole, Yorkshire to Boston, Lincolnshire.
Robina	United Kingdom	The ship ran aground off Kingsdown, Kent. She was on a voyage from South Shields, County Durham to Barcelona, Spain.
Surprise	United Kingdom	The schooner ran aground on the Nore. She was on a voyage from Inverness to London.
Zephyr	United Kingdom	The ship ran aground at Grimsby, Lincolnshire. She was on a voyage from Grimsby to Rio de Janeiro, Brazil. She was refloated but was driven against the quayside and severely damaged.

== 22 February ==
List of shipwrecks: 22 February 1870
Ship	State	Description
Albert	France	The brig foundered off the Isles of Scilly, United Kingdom. Her crew were rescued by the brigantine Bridesmaid (United Kingdom).
Auguste	Stralsund	The ship foundered in the English Channel off Eastbourne, Sussex, United Kingdom with the loss of all but three of her crew.
Bazar	France	The ship was driven ashore at Point Idzella, Sardinia, Italy. She was on a voyage from Marseille, Bouches-du-Rhône to Ajaccio, Sardinia.
Blue Jacket	United Kingdom	The Yorkshire Billyboy was wrecked on the Longsand, in the North Sea off the coast of Essex. Her crew were rescued by the smacks Celerity, Eudoxy and Kate (all United Kingdom). Blue Jacket was on a voyage from Newcastle upon Tyne, Northumberland to Southampton, Hampshire.
Confederation	United Kingdom	The brig was driven ashore 10 nautical miles (19 km) south of Whitehaven, Cumberland. Her crew were rescued.
Golden City	United States	The steamship was wrecked at Cabo San Lucas, Mexico. All on board were rescued by the steamship Panama (United States). Golden City was on a voyage from San Francisco, California to Panama City, United States of Colombia.
Herlios Seip	Flag unknown	The ship was wrecked at "Pentacottah", India. She was on a voyage from an English port to Rangoon, Burma.
Lufredenheit	Flag unknown	The ship ran aground at Dunkirk, Nord. France and was damaged. She was on a voyage from Nikolaieff, Russia to Dunkirk.
Orontes	United Kingdom	The ship departed from Villareal, Spain for Liverpool, Lancashire. No further trace, presumed foundered with the loss of all hands.
Patriotte	Italy	The brig was wrecked on Zakynthos, Greece with the loss of two lives. She was on a voyage from Galaţi, Ottoman Empire to Cork, United Kingdom.
Primrose	United Kingdom	The ship was driven ashore at Burnham-on-Sea, Somerset.
Princess Helena	United Kingdom	The schooner was driven ashore at Patras, Greece.
Sorte	Italy	The brig was wrecked at Trinità d'Agultu e Vignola, Sardinia.

== 23 February ==
List of shipwrecks: 23 February 1870
Ship	State	Description
Clyde	United Kingdom	The brig was driven ashore at Gurnard, Isle of Wight. She was on a voyage from South Shields, County Durham to Poole, Dorset.
Emblem	United Kingdom	The ship collided with Harmony (United Kingdom). She was on a voyage from Sunderland, County Durham to Galaţi, Ottoman Empire. She put in to Broadstairs, Kent, where she was beached.
Idalia	United Kingdom	The barque was lost in the Gulf of Satalia. Her crew were rescued by a French steamship.
Merriman	United Kingdom	The barque was driven ashore at Southsea, Hampshire. She was refloated and taken to Spithead.
Worsley	United Kingdom	The ship ran aground on the Barber Sand, in the North Sea off the cost of Norfolk. She was on a voyage from London to Sunderland, County Durham. She was refloated and taken in to Great Yarmouth, Norfolk in a leaky condition.

== 24 February ==
List of shipwrecks: 24 February 1870
Ship	State	Description
HMS Charybdis	Royal Navy	The Pearl-class corvette ran aground between Blunden Island and Pender Island, British Columbia, Colony of British Columbia. Subsequently refloated, repaired and returned to service.
Clyde	United Kingdom	The ship ran aground on the Qurnod Sand, off the Isle of Wight. She was on a voyage from South Shields, County Durham to Poole, Dorset.
Coquetdale	United Kingdom	The barque ran aground on the Haaks Bank, in the North Sea off the Dutch coast and sank in the Schulpengat, off Texel, North Holland, Netherlands. Her crew were rescued by the steamship Leeds (United Kingdom). Coquetdale was on a voyage from Iquique, Peru to Hamburg.
Dart	United Kingdom	The ship was driven ashore at Whitby, Yorkshire.
Dorothea	Denmark	The schooner was abandoned in the North Sea. Her crew were rescued. She was on a voyage from Køge to Hull, Yorkshire, United Kingdom.
John	United Kingdom	The smack was run down and sunk by the steamship Jason with the loss of all but one of her crew. She was on a voyage from Howth, County Dublin to Ayr.
Julia	United Kingdom	The smack foundered in Portland Race. Her crew were rescued. She was on a voyage from Looe, Cornwall to Stokes Bay.
Louisa	Spain	The ship was wrecked on the Isla de Lobos, Uruguay. Her crew were rescued. She was on a voyage from Barcelona to Montevideo, Uruguay.
Pansy	United Kingdom	The ship was driven ashore at Soldier's Point, County Antrim. She was on a voyage from Sulina, Ottoman Empire to Newry, County Antrim. She was refloated the next day and taken in to Warrenpoint, County Antrim.
Pluto	Austria-Hungary	The steamship ran aground near Varna, Ottoman Empire. Her passengers were taken off. She was on a voyage from Constantinople to Varna. She was declared a total loss.
Speakman	United Kingdom	The schooner ran aground on Taylor's Bank, in Liverpool Bay. Both crew were rescued by the tug Royal Arch (United Kingdom. Speakman was on a voyage from Liverpool to Preston, Lancashire.

== 25 February ==
List of shipwrecks: 25 February 1870
Ship	State	Description
Ebenezer	United Kingdom	The ship ran aground on the Knock Sand. She was on a voyage from Guernsey, Channel Islands to London.
Eliza	United Kingdom	The ship was driven ashore in Tor Bay.
Enoch	United Kingdom	The ship sank at Courtmacsherry, County Cork. Her crew were rescued. She was on a voyage from Youghal to Courtmacsherry.
Gem	United Kingdom	The ship was driven ashore at Ostend, West Flanders, Belgium. Her crew were rescued. She was on a voyage from London to Bruges, West Flanders. Gem was refloated and taken in to Ostend.
Giulia	Italy	The steamship was wrecked at Naples.
Hippogriff	United Kingdom	The schooner was wrecked on Scroby Sands, Norfolk with the loss of all hands.
Idomenes	Austria-Hungary	The barque collided with the steamship Earl of Elgin (United Kingdom) at Great Yarmouth, Norfolk and was severely damaged.
Leila M. Long	United States	The ship ran aground on Meyers Ledge, in the Weser. She was on a voyage from New Orleans, Louisiana to Bremen.
Maria Santissima Rosario	Italy	The ship was wrecked at Naples.
Matilda	United Kingdom	The schooner was driven ashore and wrecked at Dunnet Head, Caithness. Her crew were rescued. She was on a voyage from Kirkwall, Orkney Islands to Aberdeen.
Medea	Netherlands	The ship was driven ashore in the Weser.
Nell Gwyn	United Kingdom	The ship was driven ashore at Veulettes-sur-Mer, Seine-Inférieure, France. She was on a voyage from Java, Netherlands East Indies to a Dutch port.
Otterburn	United Kingdom	The steamship ran aground near Rosetta, Egypt. She was on a voyage from London to Ceylon.
Unnamed	Flag unknown	The ship was wrecked on the Cross Sand, in the North Sea off the coast of Norfolk with the loss of all hands.
Unnamed	United Kingdom	The smack was wrecked at Gorleston, Suffolk.

== 26 February ==
List of shipwrecks: 26 February 1870
Ship	State	Description
Otterburn	United Kingdom	The steamship ran aground at Rosetta, Egypt. She was on a voyage from London to Ceylon.

== 27 February ==
List of shipwrecks: 27 February 1870
Ship	State	Description
Pomona	United Kingdom	The brig ran aground on the Gunfleet Sand, in the North Sea off the coast of Essex. She was on a voyage from South Shields, County Durham to Rochester, Kent. She was refloated with assistance.
Preciosa	Norway	The ship was wrecked on the Jadder Bank, in the North Sea.

== 28 February ==
List of shipwrecks: 28 February 1870
Ship	State	Description
Auguste Marie	France	The schooner sank at Barra, Outer Hebrides, United Kingdom. Her seven crew were rescued. She was on a voyage from Paimpol, Côtes-du-Nord to Iceland. She subsequently floated and drifted out to sea.
Charlotte Louise Marie	France	The fishing smack collided with the brig St. Spiridione (Greece) and sank in the English Channel 12 nautical miles (22 km) south west of Beachy Head, Sussex, United Kingdom. Her crew were rescued by St. Spiridione.
Cid	Spain	The paddle steamer foundered off Cape Sant Antoni. Her crew were rescued.
Columbia	Norway	The ship was wrecked on the Jadder Bank, in the North Sea. Her crew were rescued. She was on a voyage from an Englisn port to Stavanger.
Economy	United Kingdom	The smack foundered in the Dogger Bank with the loss of all five crew.
Francisco	Italy	The brig was wrecked 10 nautical miles (19 km) from Navarino, Greece. She was on a voyage from Genoa to Constantinople, Ottoman Empire.
Friends	United Kingdom	The ship was driven ashore at Whitby, Yorkshire. She was on a voyage from Hartlepool, County Durham to Whitby. She was refloated and taken in to Whitby in a leaky condition.
Gatesforth	United Kingdom	The ship was driven ashore by ice at Hellevoetsluis, Zeeland, Netherlands. She was refloated the next day and taken in to Hellevoetsluis.
John	Sweden	The abandoned schooner was driven ashore at Seaton Carew, County Durham, United Kingdom.
Johns	United Kingdom	The schooner was wrecked on the North Gar Sands, at the mouth of the River Tees. Her six crew were rescued by the Middlesbrough Lifeboat Crossley ( Royal National Lifeboat Institution), assisted by the tug Echo (United Kingdom). Johns was on a voyage from Santander, Spain to Middlesbrough, Yorkshire.
Rosa Gasparo	Italy	The ship was wrecked near Porto-Longone, Elba. She was on a voyage from Alexandria, Egypt to Genoa.

== Unknown date ==
List of shipwrecks: Unknown date in February 1870
Ship	State	Description
Adeliza	United Kingdom	The brig was driven ashore near Cape Trafalgar, Spain. She was on a voyage from Gibraltar to Huelva, Spain.
Alessandro	Greece	The brig was wrecked at "Riva", Chile.
Aline Emma	France	The ship was abandoned off the Île d'Oléron, Charente-Inférieure. She was on a voyage from Tampico, Mexico to Bordeaux, Gironde. She was subsequently towed in to La Rochelle, Charente-Inférieure by Suzanne (France).
Analipso	Greece	The brig was wrecked near Anchiale, Ottoman Empire.
Antonio	(Spain) Cuba	The coaster foundered off Havana.
Artisan	United Kingdom	The brig was driven ashore on St. Louis Island, United States. She was on a voyage from Cardiff, Glamorgan to Galveston, Texas, United States.
Aspasia	United Kingdom	The ship was wrecked at Sigri, Lesbos, Greece.
Belle Brandon	United States	The fishing schooner was wrecked on Long Island, near Mount Desert, Maine. Crew saved.
Boatswain	United Kingdom	The brig ran aground in the Courantyne River. She was on a voyage from the Clyde to Berbice, British Guiana.
Carausius	United Kingdom	The barque was abandoned in the Atlantic Ocean before 4 February. Her crew were rescued by Althea (United Kingdom). Carausius was on a voyage from Lisbon, Portugal to Boston, Massachusetts.
Carrie Hill	United Kingdom	The ship was lost at Saint Domingo. She was on a voyage from Cardiff to Mobile, Alabama, United States.
Concordia	United Kingdom	The ship was wrecked at Anguilla. She was on a voyage from Demerara, British Guiana to Liverpool, Lancashire.
Constantine	United States	The ship was driven ashore in Tarpaulin Cove. She was on a voyage from Saint Domingo to Boston, Massachusetts.
Davila	Spain	The steamship collided with the steamship Bilboa (Spain) and sank at "Zoroza" in late February. All on board survived.
Deva, or Ed Eva	United Kingdom	The ship was driven ashore near "Apis Hill". She was on a voyage from Ancona, Papal States to Glasgow, Renfrewshire. She was refloated and put in to Gibraltar, where she arrived on 19 February.
Douwiena Timmens	Netherlands	The sloop foundered 12 nautical miles (22 km) east south east of the Farne Islands, Northumberland, United Kingdom.
Elleray	United Kingdom	The ship was lost in Chinese waters. Her crew were rescued. She was on a voyage from Liverpool, Lancashire to Yokohama, Japan.
Englishman	United Kingdom	The ship was driven ashore and wrecked at Drogheda, County Louth before 20 February.
Evangelista	Greece	The brig was wrecked near "Carabournou", Ottoman Empire.
Express	United Kingdom	The ship was driven ashore at Terrace Bay, Ontario, Canada. Shew as on a voyage from Boston, Massachusetts to Halifax, Nova Scotia, Canada.
Felix	Argentina	The ship struck the Merilles and the Le Trempe Rocks and sank. Her crew were rescued. she was on a voyage from Greenock, United Kingdom to Buenos Aires.
Flash	United Kingdom	The ship was wrecked on Inishark, County Galway.
Fortuna	United Kingdom	The ship was wrecked on Manger Key. She was on a voyage from London to Belize City, British Honduras.
Frederic Nicaise	Belgium	The ship was destroyed by fire at Batavia, Netherlands East Indies before 9 February. She was on a voyage from Hong Kong to a port in Chile.
George R. Bradford	United States	The fishing schooner sank on the way home to Gloucester, Massachusetts in a gale after leaving Fortune Bay, Newfoundland. Lost with all 6 crew.
Heaton Hall	United Kingdom	The steamship collided with the steamship Europa (United Kingdom) and was beached in the Clyde. She was on a voyage from the Clyde to a Mediterranean port.
Helios	Hamburg	The ship was driven ashore and wrecked at Cocanada, India.
J. B. V. No.1	United Kingdom	The ship damaged by fire at Buenos Aires.
Jilt	(United Kingdom of Great Britain and Ireland) Isle of Man	The schooner was driven ashore at Deadman Point, Cornwall. She was on a voyage from Livorno, Italy to Antwerp, Belgium. The Coastguard boarded the ship and found two crew dead. It was alleged that her captain had murdered one of them and he was arrested. Jilt was refloated on 16 February with assistance from the tug Dandy ( (United Kingdom of Great Britain and Ireland) ) and towed in to Falmouth, Cornwall.
John Bunyan	United Kingdom	The ship was driven ashore at Pensacola, Florida. She was later refloated.
Joseph Frank	United States	The ship was driven ashore near Cádiz, Spain. She was on a voyage from New York to Cádiz. She was refloated and taken in to Sanlúcar de Barrameda.
Lady Alice Kenlis	United Kingdom	The ship was driven ashore at Dundrum, County Down. She was on a voyage from Belfast, County Antrim to Dundrum. The hulk eventually ended up on the Sutton Hoo estate.
Leon Crespo	United Kingdom	The ship caught fire and was scuttled "at Chincora". She was on a voyage from Cardiff to Valparaíso, Chile.
M. and E. Robbins	United Kingdom	The ship was wrecked on Cape Sable Island, Nova Scotia. She was on a voyage from Boston, Massachusetts to Queenstown, County Cork.
Mary	United Kingdom	The ship was abandoned in the Atlantic Ocean before 10 February. Barratry suspected as the cause of loss. She was on a voyage from Cork to Callao, Peru.
Mary	United States	The ship foundered at sea. She was on a voyage from Callao to Boston, Massachusetts.
Mary Alice	Canada	The ship was wrecked on Grand Bahama, Bahamas. Her crew were rescued.
Mary Kelly	United Kingdom	The ship was abandoned at sea. She was on a voyage from Saint John's, Newfoundland Colony to Cárdenas, Cuba.
Myrtle	United Kingdom	The brig ran aground on the Longsand. She was on a voyage from the West Indies to Ipswich, Suffolk. She was refloated with the assistance of nine smacks and a tug and beached at Harwich, Essex.
Nora	United Kingdom	The ship collided with another vessel and sank. She was on a voyage from Rio de Janeiro, Brazil to Baltimore, Maryland, United States.
Petite Auguste	France	The ship was wrecked near Cádiz, Spain. She was on a voyage from Cherbourg, Seine-Inférieure, France to Cádiz.
Reindeer	United States	The steamship was wrecked at Port Aransas, Texas.
Republique	France	The ship was driven ashore on Flores Island, Azores. She was on a voyage from Marseille, Bouches-du-Rhône to Martinique.
Runnymede	United Kingdom	The brig was lost on the east coast of Japan.
San Fernando	Spain	The ship ran aground. She was on a voyage from Manila, Spanish East Indies to Liverpool. She was refloated and put back to Manila.
Susan H. Gibson	United States	The ship was lost on the Spanish Main. She was on a voyage from Boston, Massachusetts to Laguna, Brazil.
Teresina	Italy	The schooner was lost near Ostia.
Tulsco	United States	The ship ran aground at Philadelphia, Pennsylvania. She was on a voyage from Philadelphia to Havre de Grâce, Seine-Inférieure, France. She was refloated and put back to Philadelphia.
Vasilefs Georgios	Royal Hellenic Navy	The ironclad was damaged at sea, dislodging guns in one of her turrets. She put in to Lisbon, Portugal for repairs on 9 February.
Virgendi Begona	Flag unknown	The ship was driven ashore in the Gironde. She was on a voyage from Havana, Cuba to the Gironde.
Voltigeur	United Kingdom	The ship was severely damaged by fire at West Hartlepool, County Durham.
Westburn	United Kingdom	The ship was lost in the Pescadores. Her crew survived. She was on a voyage from Foo Chow Foo, China to London.
Zwee Bruder	Flag unknown	The ship was driven ashore near Pola, Austria-Hungary. She was on a voyage from Pernambuco, Brazil to Pola. She was later refloated.
Unnamed	Flag unknown	The ship was wrecked near Ventnor, Isle of Wight, United Kingdom before 12 February.
