= Spit Bank Lighthouse =

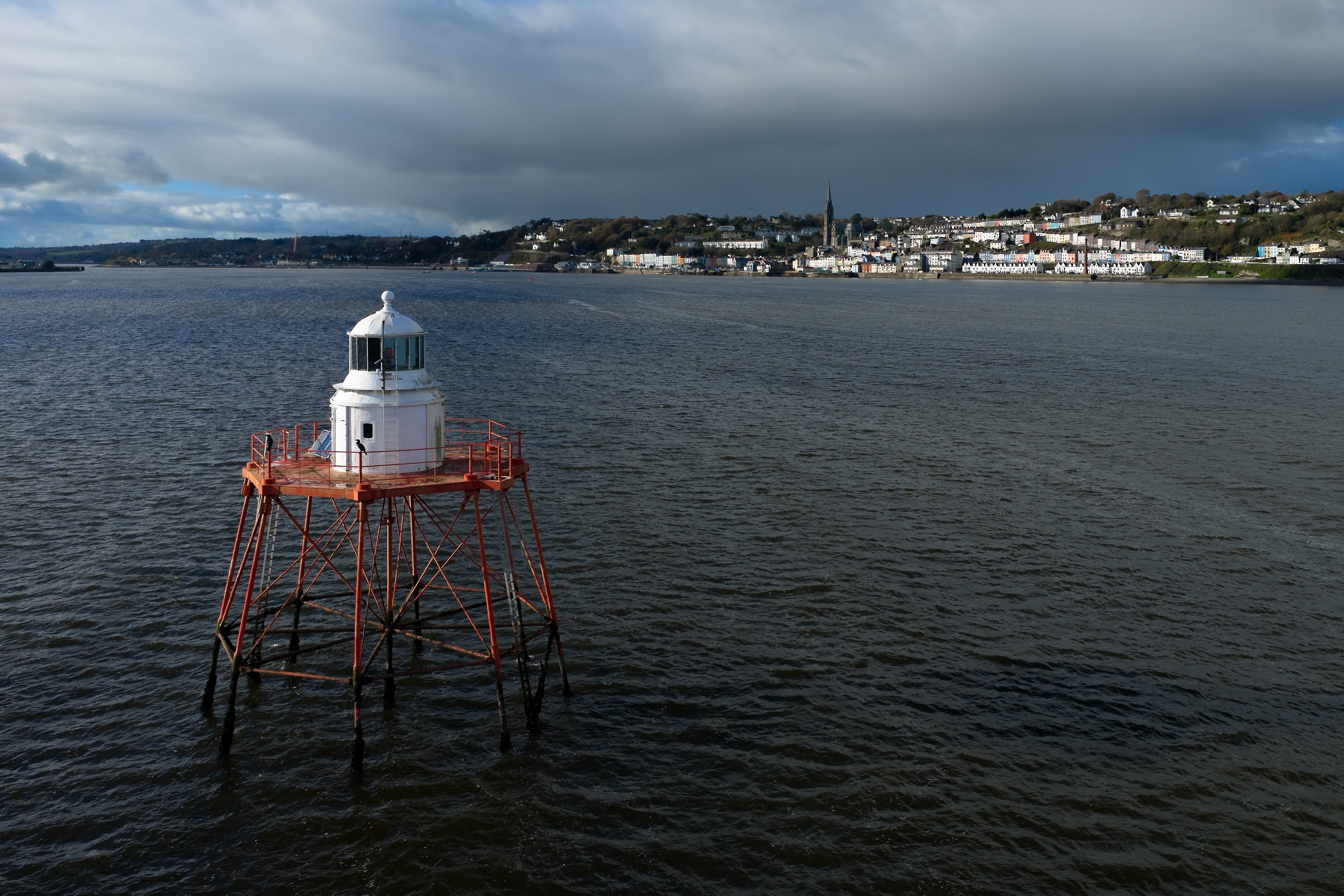
- Spit Bank Lighthouse with Cobh in the background
- Location: Cork Harbour, Ireland
- Coordinates: 51°50′43″N 8°16′26″W

Tower
- Constructed: 1851
- Foundation: Screw-pile
- Construction: Cast-iron, metal-plate
- Shape: Octagonal
- Markings: White (house), red (platform/piles)
- Operator: Cork Harbour Commissioners
- Fog signal: Horn

Light
- First lit: 1853
- Focal height: 10 metres (33 ft)
- Range: 10 nmi (19 km; 12 mi) (white), 7 nmi (13 km; 8.1 mi) (red)
- Characteristic: Fl.(2)

The Spit Bank Lighthouse close to Cobh in County Cork, Ireland is a screw-pile lighthouse which marks a shallow bank in the navigable channels of lower Cork Harbour. The platform was built by the blind Irish engineer Alexander Mitchell (who pioneered the screw-pile technology used), with the lighthouse itself designed by George Halpin. In use since its completion between 1851 and 1853, and renovated as recently as 2013, the landmark structure marks the boundary of compulsory pilotage for large vessels entering the Port of Cork.

== Design and construction ==
Though Irish engineer Alexander Mitchell went blind in 1802 (before he turned 23), he patented the screw-pile mooring in 1833, and built the first screw-pile lighthouses in 1838. These lighthouses included the Maplin Sands Light (1838) and Wyre Light (1839) in England.

Based from Belfast, Mitchell moved to Cobh (then called Queenstown) in 1851 to supervise the foundation works for a lighthouse on the Spit Bank. Located in a relative shallow between Spike Island and Cove Fort, the lighthouse replaced an unlit buoy which marked a turn required by shipping to follow Cork Harbour's main navigable channel. Despite his blindness, with assistance from his son and grandson, Mitchell reportedly supervised some of the work directly. Contemporary accounts record how he was personally involved in construction of a number of his structures, transiting to the work sites in small boats, crawling on planks and examining joints by touch. While living in the area, he also befriended logician George Boole – who was based at Cork's university.

The structure's platform is supported by nine cast-iron screwpiles 60 centimetres (2.0 ft) in diameter and driven approximately 5.2 metres (17 ft) into the sea-bed. The main light and octagonal sheet-iron lighthouse was designed by the engineer to the Commissioners of Irish Lights, George Halpin. With the foundation work laid relatively quickly, the lighthouse was first lit in 1853.

== Operation ==
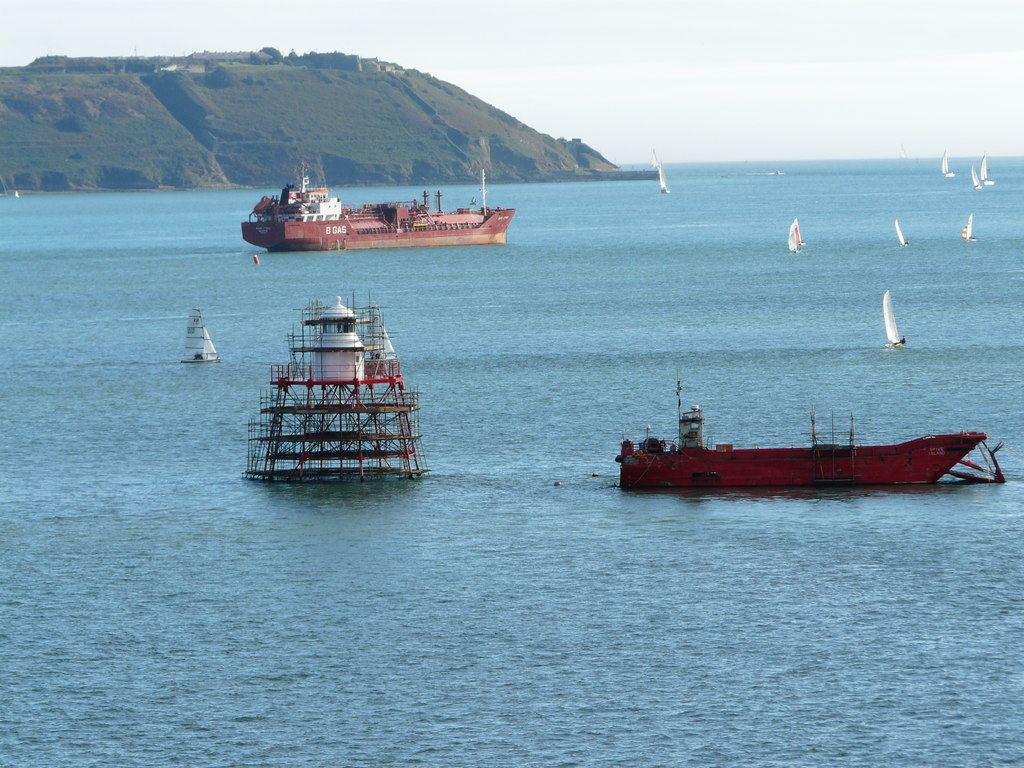
Spit Bank under repair in 2013

Located less than a half-mile from shore, and with no permanent accommodation, the light was managed by keepers who transited from the nearby town of Cobh. A foghorn was added in the late 19th century, and the light updated and automated in the 20th century. In use for more than 150 years, and one of only three remaining screw-pile lighthouses in Ireland, it was repaired following a collision in 1978, and renovated in 2013.

As of 2016 it remained a working light, with a focal plane of 10 metres (33 ft) and white and red light lenses – depending on direction of approach. The Port of Cork uses the Spit Bank Lighthouse as a boundary marker for the compulsory pilotage of large vessels entering the middle harbour.

== See also ==
- List of lighthouses in Ireland
