= Wyre Light =

Lighthouse at Fleetwood, Lancashire, England

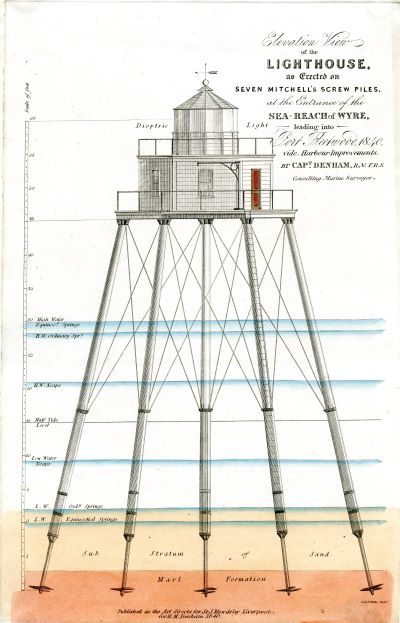
- 1840 elevation drawing of Wyre Light
- Location: offshore Fleetwood; Lancashire; England; United Kingdom
- Coordinates: 53.953°N 3.027°W

Tower
- Constructed: 1840
- Foundation: wrought iron piles
- Construction: cast iron screw-pile lighthouse
- Height: 4.9 metres (16 ft) (piles)
- Shape: hexagonal frustum structure with platform, keeper's quarter and lantern

Light
- Deactivated: 1979
- Focal height: 14 metres (46 ft) (above half tide level)
- Range: 8 nautical miles (15 km; 9.2 mi)

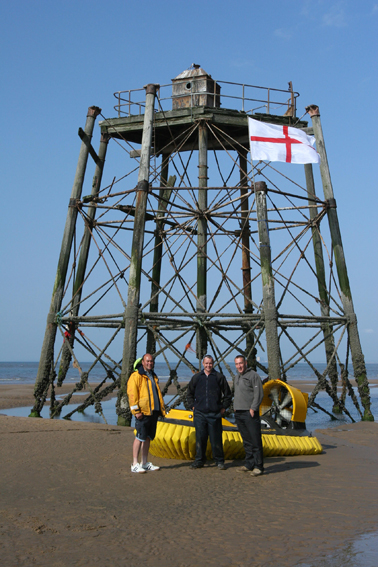
The derelict Wyre Light in 2007

The Wyre Light was a 40-foot (12 m) tall iron screw-pile lighthouse marking the navigation channel to the town of Fleetwood, Lancashire, England. As of 27th December 2025 on the clearest day possible the light is now hardly visible at low tide and appears to have collapsed fully.

== History ==
The lighthouse was designed by Alexander Mitchell, an Irish engineer who developed the screwpile concept. It was the first screwpile lighthouse ever to be lit. Although construction of the Maplin Sands Light on the northern bank of the Thames estuary had started before Wyre Light, the latter was completed in a much shorter period of time. These lights inspired other similar constructions such as the Thomas Point Shoal Light in the United States.

The Wyre Light stood 2 nautical miles (3.7 km) offshore on the 'North Wharf Bank', sandbanks which mark the 'Lune Deep' and the navigation channel of the Wyre. The Wyre Light along with a pair of on shore lighthouses, the Beach Lighthouse and the Pharos provided a navigational guide to shipping entering the Wyre estuary.

The Light's base consisted of seven wrought iron piles embedded in the sands. Each was 16 ft (4.9 m) long with cast-iron screw bases 3 ft (0.91 m) in diameter. The six corner piles formed a hexagonal platform of 50 ft (15 m) diameter. (The seventh pile served as a centre pillar.) The platform supported the lantern and a two-storey building to house the keeper. Construction began in 1839 and the lantern was lit on 6 June 1840. The building was destroyed by fire in 1948 and not replaced. After the fire, the beacon was made automatic and eventually replaced by a lighted buoy in 1979, leaving behind a derelict structure.

On 25 July 2017, the lighthouse partially collapsed into the sea.

== See also ==
- Maplin Sands
- List of lighthouses in England

== Sources ==
- H N Denham, Sailing directions from Port Lynas to Liverpool... Mawdsley, Liverpool, 1840
