= St Mary's Church, Fleetwood =

Coordinates: 53.9227°N 3.0105°W

St Mary's
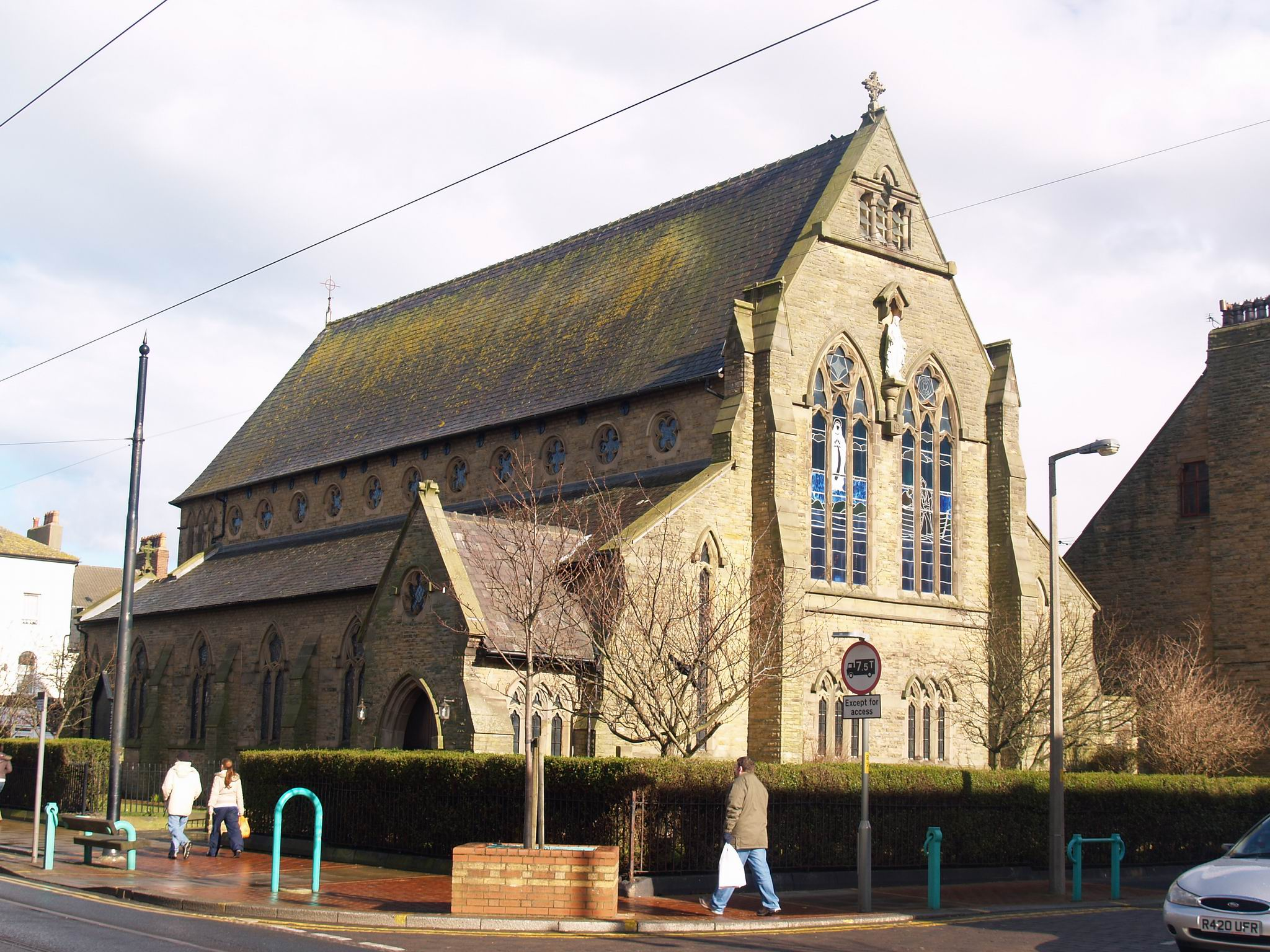
- St Mary's Church from the north-west

- Location in Fleetwood
- OS grid reference: SD 33736 47872
- Location: Fleetwood, Lancashire
- Country: England
- Denomination: Roman Catholic
- Website: https://www.stmarys-fleetwood.org.uk/

Architecture
- Functional status: Active
- Heritage designation: Grade II
- Designated: 31 March 1978
- Architect: E. W. Pugin
- Completed: 1867
- Construction cost: £4,000 (1867)

Administration
- Province: Liverpool
- Diocese: Lancaster

St Mary's is a Roman Catholic church in Fleetwood, Lancashire, England. Designed by E. W. Pugin, it was built in 1866–67. It is an active church in the Roman Catholic Diocese of Lancaster. It has been designated a Grade II listed building by English Heritage.

== History ==
The seaside town of Fleetwood was planned in the 1830s by local landowner Peter Hesketh-Fleetwood. St Mary's Church, designed by E. W. Pugin, was built 1866-67 by T. A. Drummond of Fleetwood, costing £4,000. This is equivalent to £387,200 in present-day terms. The foundation stone was laid on 17 May 1866 by Alexander Goss, the Bishop of Liverpool, and the church was consecrated by Bishop Goss in November 1867. In 1978 the church was designated a Grade II listed building.

== Architecture ==
St Mary's is constructed of rockfaced stone with ashlar dressings and has deeply pitched roofs of slate. Its plan consists of a nave and chancel combined under one roof, low north and south aisles with lean-to roofs, and a polygonal apse. There is no tower. The west wall has two large windows, each with three lancets; between the two is a niche containing a figure of Jesus Christ. The windows in the aisles have large two-light lancets and cinquefoils. The clerestory windows above are quatrefoil oculi.

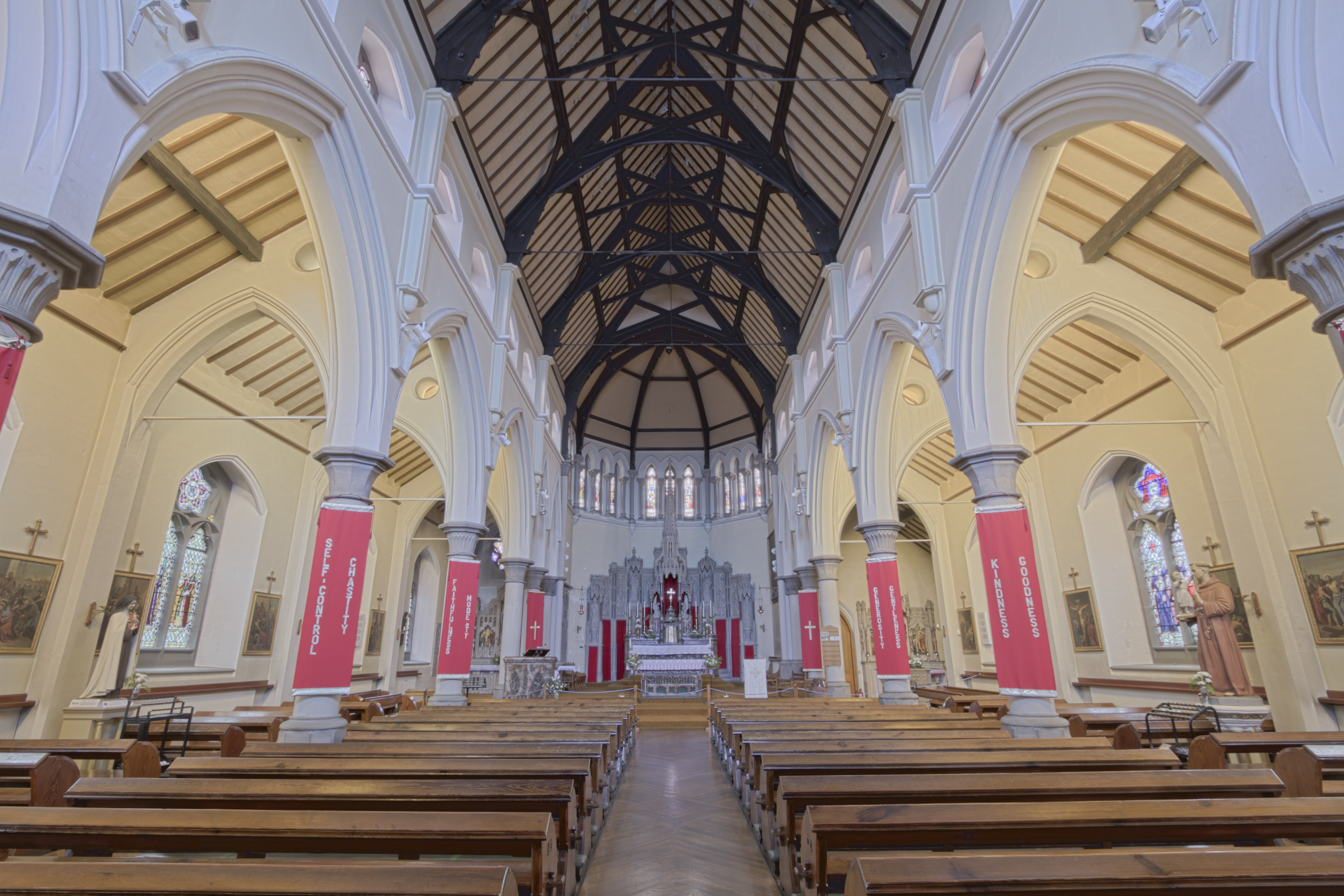
Here is a photograph taken from inside St Mary's Church

== See also ==
- Listed buildings in Fleetwood
