= Listed buildings in Fleetwood =

Historic structures in Lancashire, England

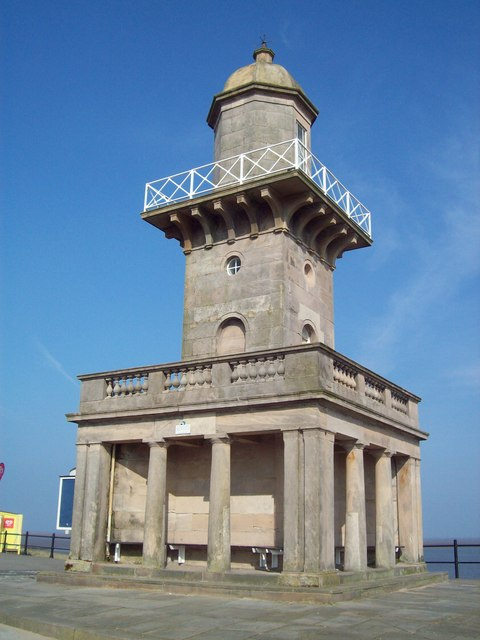
The Lower Lighthouse (1840), designed by Decimus Burton and engineered by Henry Mangles Denham

Fleetwood is a fishing and market town within the Wyre district of Lancashire, England, lying at the northwest corner of the Fylde coast. All of the 44 listed buildings are recorded in the National Heritage List for England at Grade II.

Fleetwood is a planned town of the Victorian era. In 1836, local landowner and Preston MP Peter Hesketh employed architect Decimus Burton to design the new town. Burton planned the town so that the main streets radiated from a slightly raised piece of land in the centre called the Mount. The Mount was topped with a pagoda designed by Burton. The pagoda no longer exists but its replacement, a pavilion built in 1902, is listed at Grade II.

In the United Kingdom, the term "listed building" refers to a building or other structure officially designated as being of special architectural, historical or cultural significance. These buildings are in three grades: Grade I consists of buildings of outstanding architectural or historical interest; Grade II* includes particularly significant buildings of more than local interest; Grade II consists of buildings of special architectural or historical interest. Buildings in England are listed by the Secretary of State for Culture, Media and Sport on recommendations provided by English Heritage, which also determines the grading.

== Key ==
Explanation of the listed building grades
Grade	Criteria
Grade II	Buildings of national importance and special interest

== Listed buildings ==
List of the buildings and structures with photographs, locations, year or time of earliest construction, descriptive notes, and listed building grade
Name and location	Photograph	Grade	Date	Description
1–9 Pharos Street (odd numbers); 53.9263°N 3.0076°W		II	c. 1846	These houses date from some time after 1845 and are the only remaining original buildings of a larger circus built around the Upper Lighthouse. They are constructed of red brick with pitched slate roofs and are on two storeys. Numbers 1, 5, 7 and 9 have doorways with rendered Tuscan frames.
15 St Peter's Place; 53.9236°N 3.0104°W		II	between 1841 and 1845	This three-storey house was built between 1841 and 1845. It is constructed of red brick with ashlar dressings and has blue-grey slate roofs. There is a continuous sill plate across the front of number 15 and its neighbours at the first floor level; at the eaves there is a moulded cornice.
2–40 Mount Street; 53.9215°N 3.0131°W		II	between 1836 and 1841	These houses were built between 1836 and 1841 under the supervision of Decimus Burton. They are rendered, with modern tile roofs. They have two storeys and sash windows.
16–20, 21–23, 24–29 Queen's Terrace; 53.9264°N 3.0067°W		II	1836–41	This range of houses was built by 1841, designed by Decimus Burton. They are constructed of ashlar, with hipped roofs of slate.
23–27 Lord Street (odd numbers); 53.9234°N 3.0093°W		II	mid-19th century	These houses were built in the mid-19th century. On three storeys, they are rendered.
26 and 28 Dock Street; 53.9233°N 3.0061°W		II	mid-19th century	This building dates from the mid-19th century. It is constructed of ashlar. It has three storeys and its pitched roof is of slate.
29 Church Street; 53.9233°N 3.0094°W		II	early 20th century	This building dates from the early 20th century. It is constructed of ashlar.
3 Kent Street; 53.9254°N 3.0068°W		II	mid-19th century	This house was built in the mid-19th century. It is constructed of red brick with a hipped roof of slate. It is on two storeys and has a canted corner. The sash windows have glazing bars on both sides.
3–5 Queen's Terrace; 53.9244°N 3.0056°W		II	1836–39	These houses were built by 1839 under the supervision of (and probably designed by) Decimus Burton. They are constructed of red brick with hipped roofs of slate. They are on two storeys and each have three ranges of sash windows. The front entrances have Tuscan frames.
32 Lord Street; 53.9234°N 3.0100°W		II	mid-19th century	This building dates from the mid-19th century. It is constructed of rendered brick and has three storeys.
32 North Albert Street; 53.9251°N 3.0083°W		II	mid-19th century	This building dates from the mid-19th century. It is constructed of red brick with the first floor rendered. Its pitched roof is of slate. The doorway has fluted Ionic columns.
34 Warren Street; 53.9230°N 3.0100°W		II	1836–41	This building was completed by 1841, under the supervision of (and probably designed by) Decimus Burton. It is rendered and has three storeys. There are two ranges of sash windows.
45 and 47 Warren Street; 53.9230°N 3.0101°W		II	mid-19th century	This building dates from the mid-19th century. It is constructed of ashlar and has three storeys.
50–96 Mount Street; 53.9227°N 3.0145°W		II	1836–41	This range of houses was built 1836–41 under the supervision of (and probably designed by) Decimus Burton. they are constructed of red brick, and some are rendered.
51–97 Mount Street; 53.9224°N 3.0147°W		II	1836–41	This range of houses was built 1836–41 under the supervision of (and probably designed by) Decimus Burton. They are constructed of red brick and are rendered.
8 Queen's Terrace; 53.9249°N 3.0058°W		II	c. 1839	This building was completed by 1839, under the supervision of (and probably designed by) Decimus Burton. It is constructed of red brick with a pitched roof of slate. It has two storeys, with three ranges of sash windows.
Chaucer County Junior School and surrounding wall 53.9228°N 3.0191°W		II	early 20th century	Chaucer School was built in the early 20th century. It is constructed of red brick and its hipped roof is of tile. It has two storeys. The surrounding wall is red brick with terracotta coping.
Citizen's Advice Bureau; 53.9252°N 3.0153°W		II	1841	This building dates from 1841, possibly designed by Decimus Burton. It serves as the entrance to The Mount Pavilion. it is constructed of ashlar; its pitched roof is modern, constructed of tile. The roof has overhanging eaves supported by wooden brackets.
Drinking Fountain on East Side of Euston Park; 53.9282°N 3.0080°W		II	late 19th century	The drinking fountain was built in the late 19th century and is constructed of cast iron. It has a semi-circular bowl which sits on sphinxes. Above is a baluster, topped by a cherub.
Fleetwood Museum; 53.9247°N 3.0058°W		II	1836	This building dates from 1836, designed by Decimus Burton. It was the first building of the new town, originally the Customs House and now houses Fleetwood Museum. Built on two storeys, it is rendered with roughcast. It has eight ranges of sash windows. At the roof line there is a decorative iron parapet. The front entrances are through porticos which are flanked by Tuscan columns.
Fleetwood Museum and Public Library (former); 53.9233°N 3.0063°W		II	1863	The former museum and public library on Dock Street was built in 1863 to a design by Thomas Atkinson. It is constructed of red brick with ashlar dressings in the Venetian Gothic style. It is built on two storeys and has an ashlar parapet.
Fleetwood Working Men's Club; 53.9221°N 3.0100°W		II	1841–45	This working men's club was built 1841–45. It is constructed of ashlar with a pitched roof of slate.
LMR Sports and Social Club, Dock Street; 53.9219°N 3.0095°W		II	1836–41	These buildings were completed by 1841, under the supervision of (and probably designed by) Decimus Burton.
Lower Lighthouse; 53.9285°N 3.0091°W		II	1840	The Lower Lighthouse was built 1840 to a design by Decimus Burton, engineered by Henry Mangles Denham. The light is 44 feet (13 m) above half-tide level. It is constructed of stone, in three stages.
The Mount Pavilion; 53.9258°N 3.0161°W		II	1904	This seaside pavilion was built in 1902 or 1904. It replaced a pagoda designed by Decimus Burton, around which he planned the layout of Fleetwood. The pavilion is constructed of roughcast brick with tile roofs. It has an octagonal dome with a copper roof.
North Euston Hotel; 53.9280°N 3.0092°W		II	1840–41	This hotel was built 1840–41 to a design by Decimus Burton. It is constructed of ashlar with a slate roof that is hipped in the centre block, and mansard elsewhere.
Pennine View; 53.9222°N 3.0090°W		II	between 1841 and 1845	Pennine View, formerly the Crown Hotel, was built between 1841 and 1845 to a design by A. Tuach. It is constructed of ashlar with a modern roof. It has three storeys and a pilastered stone doorway.
Presbytery to St Mary's Church; 53.9225°N 3.0106°W		II	1878	The presbytery to the north of St Mary's was built in 1878, designed by Innocent and Brown of Sheffield. It is constructed of rock-faced stone with a pitched of slate. It has two storeys and a full-height canted bay with a hipped roof.
Prince Arthur Hotel; 53.9231°N 3.0107°W		II	mid-19th century	The Prince Arthur Hotel was built in the mid-19th century. It is constructed of red brick and has painted ashlar dressings. Its pitched roof is slate.
Radar Training Station		II	1961–62	The Radar Training Station was built 1961–62 or 1964–65 to a design by the Lancashire County Council Architect's Department. The project architect was Eric Morris Hart. It is constructed of reinforced concrete.
Rossall School Chapel; 53.8946°N 3.0450°W		II	1861–62	This chapel of Saint John the Evangelist was built 1861–62 to a design by Edward Graham Paley. It is constructed of hammer-dressed stone with ashlar dressings.
East Range of Quadrangle at Rossall School; 53.8957°N 3.0440°W		II	1867	This range was built in 1867 to a design by Edward Graham Paley.
Falcon House, Rossall School; 53.8966°N 3.0430°W		II	mid-19th century	This building dates from the mid-19th century. it is constructed of red brick, with a pitched roof of slate. It has two storeys.
Rossall School Gazebo and wall leading south from the gazebo 53.8952°N 3.0455°W		II	early 18th century	The gazebo with attached wall was built in the early 18th century, designed by either Richard (d. 1709) or Edward Fleetwood (d. 1757). It is constructed of red brick, with ashlar dressings.
Rossall School Library; 53.8957°N 3.0448°W		II	1850	The Sumner Library, formerly a chapel, was built in 1850 to a design by J. E. Gregan of Manchester. It is constructed of hammer-dressed stone with ashlar dressings.
North Range of Quadrangle at Rossall School; 53.8961°N 3.0453°W		II	1853	This range was built in 1853 to a design by Edward Graham Paley.
West Range of Quadrangle at Rossall School; 53.8958°N 3.0457°W		II	c. 1885–90	This range was built c. 1885–90 to a design by Edward Graham Paley, Hubert Austin and Henry Paley.
St Mary's Church; 53.9227°N 3.0105°W		II	1866–67	St Mary's was built 1866–67 to a design by Edward Welby Pugin. It is constructed of rockfaced stone with ashlar dressings and has pitched roofs of slate. Its nave and chancel are under one roof and there is no tower.
St Peter's Church; 53.9239°N 3.0094°W		II	1840–41	St Peter's Church was built 1840–41 to a design by Decimus Burton. It is constructed of rock-faced stone, with ashlar dressings. It was remodelled in 1883 by Paley and Austin.
Upper Lighthouse; 53.9265°N 3.0075°W		II	1840	Built 1839–40 probably to a design by Decimus Burton. It is constructed of red sandstone with ashlar dressings.
Victoria Public House; 53.9232°N 3.0066°W		II	1836–41	This range of shops was completed by 1841, under the supervision of (and probably designed by) Decimus Burton. They are rendered, and on three storeys.
War Memorial; 53.9190°N 3.0234°W		II	1927	The war memorial in Memorial Park dates from 1927.
Memorial Park Gateway; 53.91953°N 3.0209°W		II	1902	The gates were added to the gateway in 1926. The gateway consists of a rendered brick triumphal arch in Baroque style. There is a large central arch, flanked by smaller arches, and there is a balustrade over the central arch.
St Nicholas Church; 53.91866°N 3.03011°W		II	1960–62	The church is in red brick with a timber-slatted gable and a copper-clad roof. It consists of a central pylon-like tower, a nave with side aisles incorporating vestries, porches and a chancel. On each side of the nave are three triangular dormers, and there are three similar, smaller dormers on the chancel.

== See also ==
- Listed buildings in Lancashire
