= St Peter's Church, Fleetwood =

Coordinates: 53.9239°N 3.0094°W

St Peter's
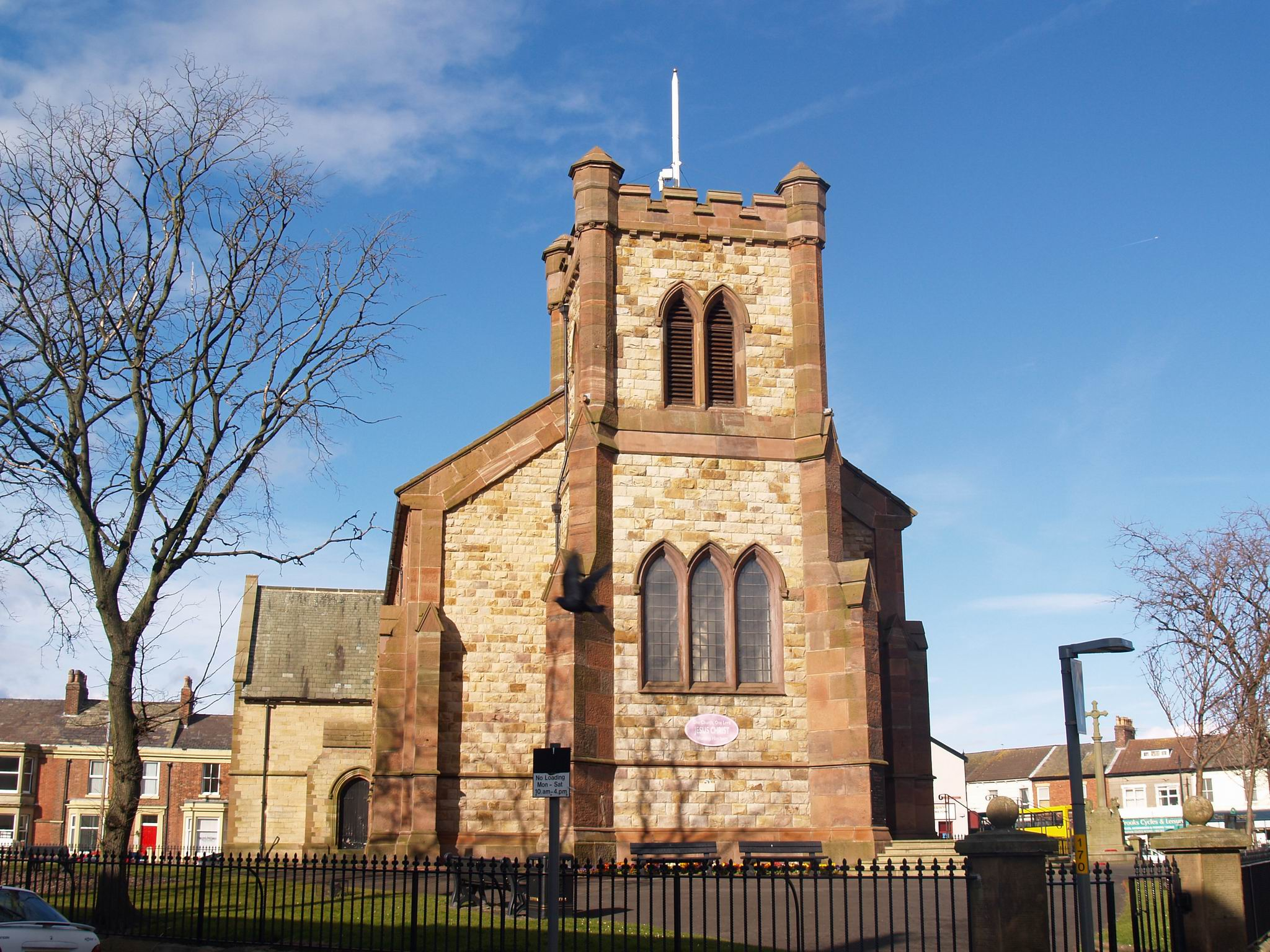
- St Peter's Church, from the south

- Location in Fleetwood
- OS grid reference: SD 338 480
- Location: Fleetwood, Lancashire
- Country: England
- Denomination: Anglican

History
- Status: Parish church
- Consecrated: 1841

Architecture
- Functional status: Active
- Heritage designation: Grade II
- Designated: 31 March 1978
- Architect(s): Decimus Burton, Paley and Austin (1883 extension)

Administration
- Province: York
- Diocese: Blackburn
- Archdeaconry: Lancaster
- Deanery: Poulton

St Peter's Church is in the seaside town of Fleetwood, Lancashire, England, situated on the Fylde coast. It is an active Anglican parish church in the Diocese of Blackburn. It was completed in 1841, to a design by Decimus Burton. Burton had been employed by Peter Hesketh-Fleetwood in 1836 to lay out the new planned town of Fleetwood. It is protected as a Grade II listed building.

== History ==
Fleetwood is a 19th-century planned town, the creation of local landowner and Preston MP, Sir Peter Hesketh-Fleetwood. In 1836, he employed Decimus Burton to lay out the new town. The new parish church was one of the buildings Burton designed. It was built in 1839–41 (Hesketh-Fleetwood laid the foundation stone) and consecrated in 1841. Hesketh-Fleetwood's aunt, Anna-Maria Hesketh of Tulketh Hall, financed the construction of the tower and spire; the spire was taken down in 1904 for safety reasons. In 1883, the east end of the church was altered by the Lancaster architects Paley and Austin, who added a chancel, a transeptal chapel and an organ chamber. These alterations cost £3,000 (equivalent to £320,000 in 2025).

== Architecture ==
St Peter's stands on a raised piece of land in the town centre. Surrounded by an iron palisade, it is constructed of grey rock-faced stone with red sandstone ashlar dressings. The side walls and the tower have lancet windows. The nave is aisleless. Of the church's design, architectural historian Nikolaus Pevsner commented "It could be by anybody."

The church has space for 400 people; originally 200 more could be accommodated in the galleries to the north and south; these were removed in 1960.

== Assessment and administration ==
St Peter's was designated a Grade II listed building on 31 March 1978.

St Peter's is an active parish church in the Anglican Diocese of Blackburn, which is part of the Province of York. It is in the archdeaconry of Lancaster and the Deanery of Poulton.

== See also ==
- Listed buildings in Fleetwood
- List of ecclesiastical works by Paley and Austin
