= Alexander Mitchell (engineer) =

Irish inventor and engineer (1780–1868)

Alexander Mitchell MICE
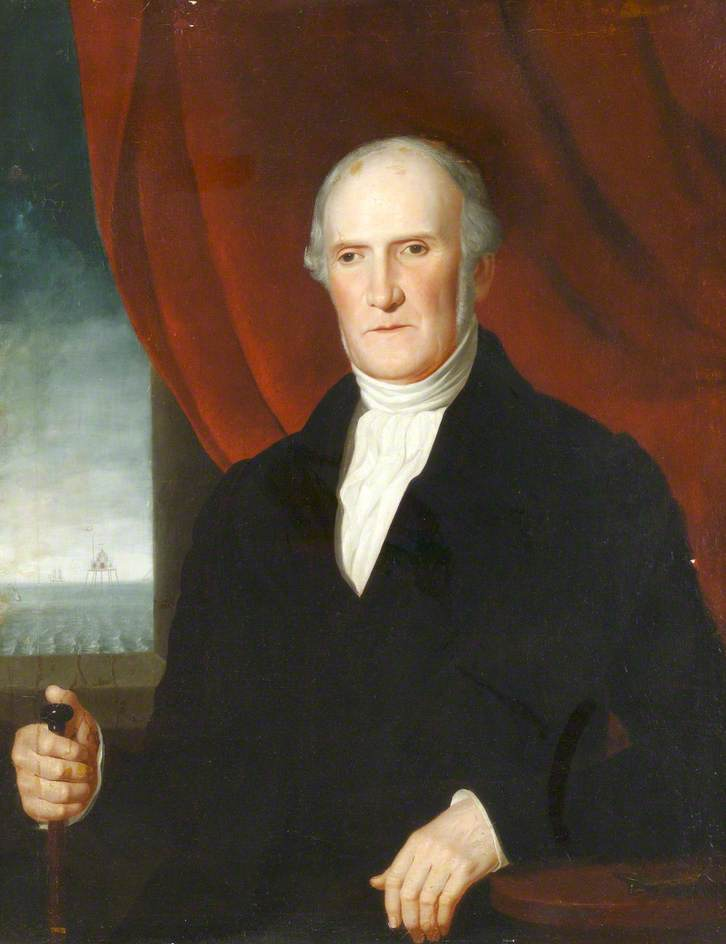
- 1873 portrait of Mitchell, by Richard Hooke, with Dundalk Bay and lighthouse to rear
- Born: 13 April 1780; Dublin, Kingdom of Ireland
- Died: 25 June 1868 (aged 88); Near Belfast, Ireland
- Education: Belfast Royal Academy
- Known for: Screw-pile lighthouse
- Notable work: Maplin Sands Lighthouse; Wyre Light; Spit Bank Lighthouse
- Awards: Telford Medal (1848)
- Engineering career
- Discipline: Civil engineering
- Significant design: Screw piles

Alexander Mitchell (13 April 1780 – 25 June 1868) was an Irish engineer who from 1802 onward was blind. He is known as the inventor of the screw-pile lighthouse.

== Early life ==
Born in Dublin, his family moved to Belfast while he was a child, and he received his formal education at Belfast Royal Academy, where he excelled in mathematics.

== Career ==
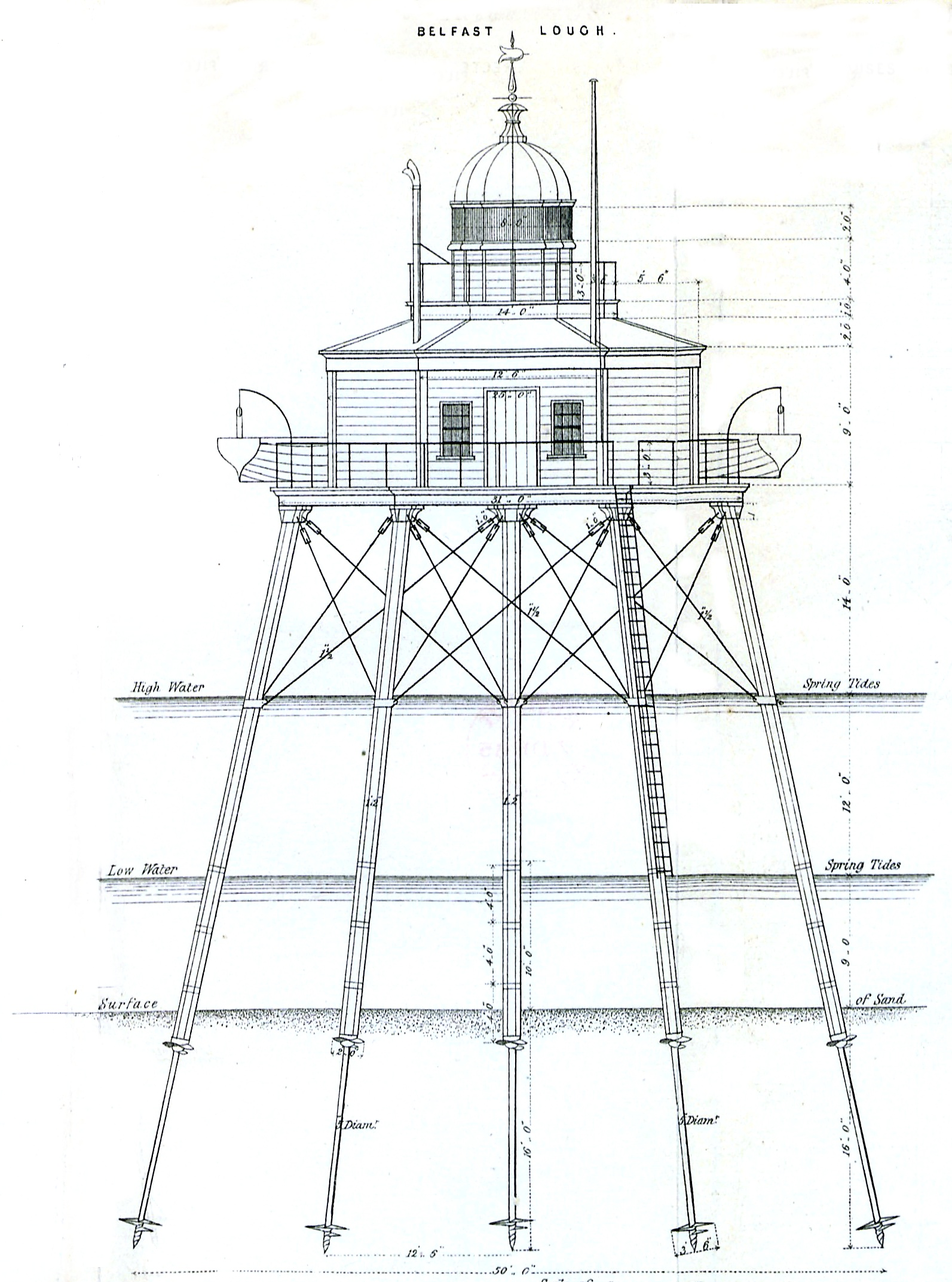
Plan from the late 1840s of Mitchell's lighthouse in Belfast Lough

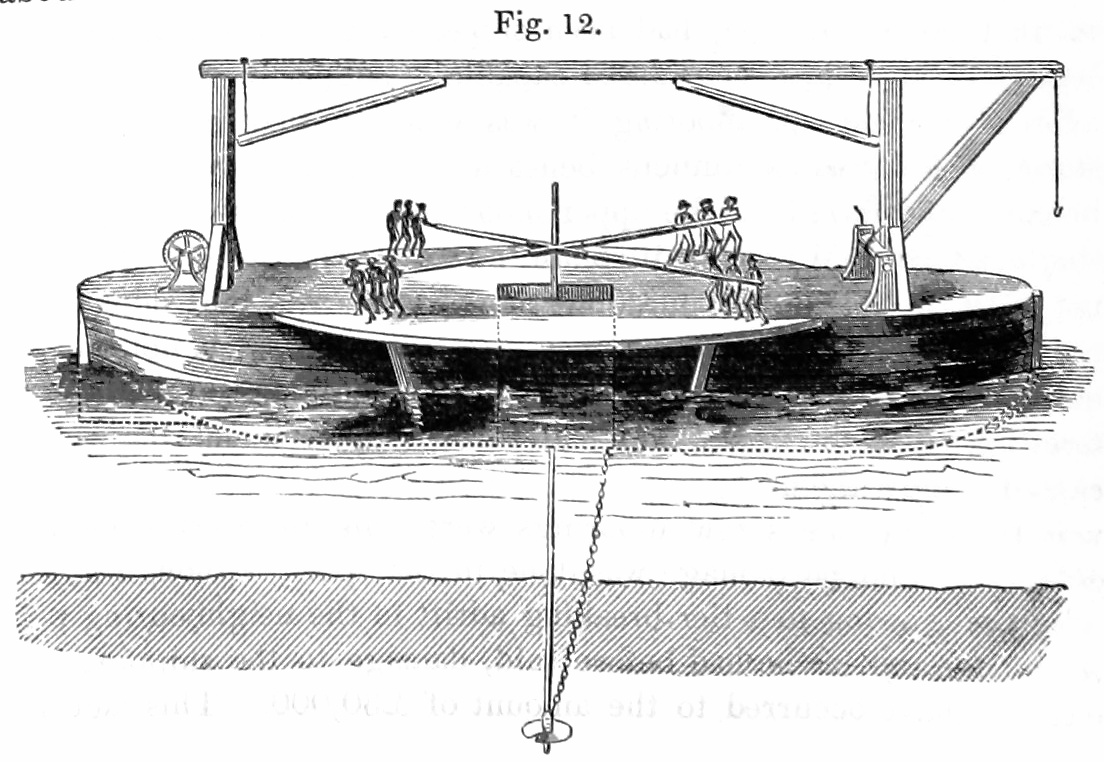
Illustration of Mitchell's screwpile method

Originally working in brickmaking in Belfast, he invented machines used in that trade, before patenting the screw-pile in 1833, for which he would later gain some fame. The screw-pile was used for the erection of lighthouses and other structures on mudbanks and shifting sands, including bridges and piers. Mitchell's designs and methods were employed all over the world from Portland breakwater to Bombay bridges. Initially it was used for the construction of lighthouses on Maplin Sands in the Thames Estuary (the first light application, in 1838), the Wyre Light at Fleetwood in Lancashire (the first such beacon lit) completed, in 1839), and at Belfast Lough where his lighthouse was finished in July 1844.

In May 1851 he moved to Cobh to lay the foundation for a lighthouse on the Spit Bank; the success of these undertakings led to the use of his invention on the breakwater at Portland, the viaduct and bridges on the Bombay, Baroda and Central India Railway and a broad system of Indian telegraphs.

While in Cork, Mitchell became friendly with astronomer John Thomas Romney Robinson, and mathematician George Boole.

== Awards and honours ==
In 1848, he was elected a member of the Institution of Civil Engineers and received the Telford Medal the same year for a paper on his invention.

== Death ==
Mitchell died at Glen Devis near Belfast on 25 June 1868. His wife and daughter had predeceased him.
