= Screw piles =

Construction component used for foundations

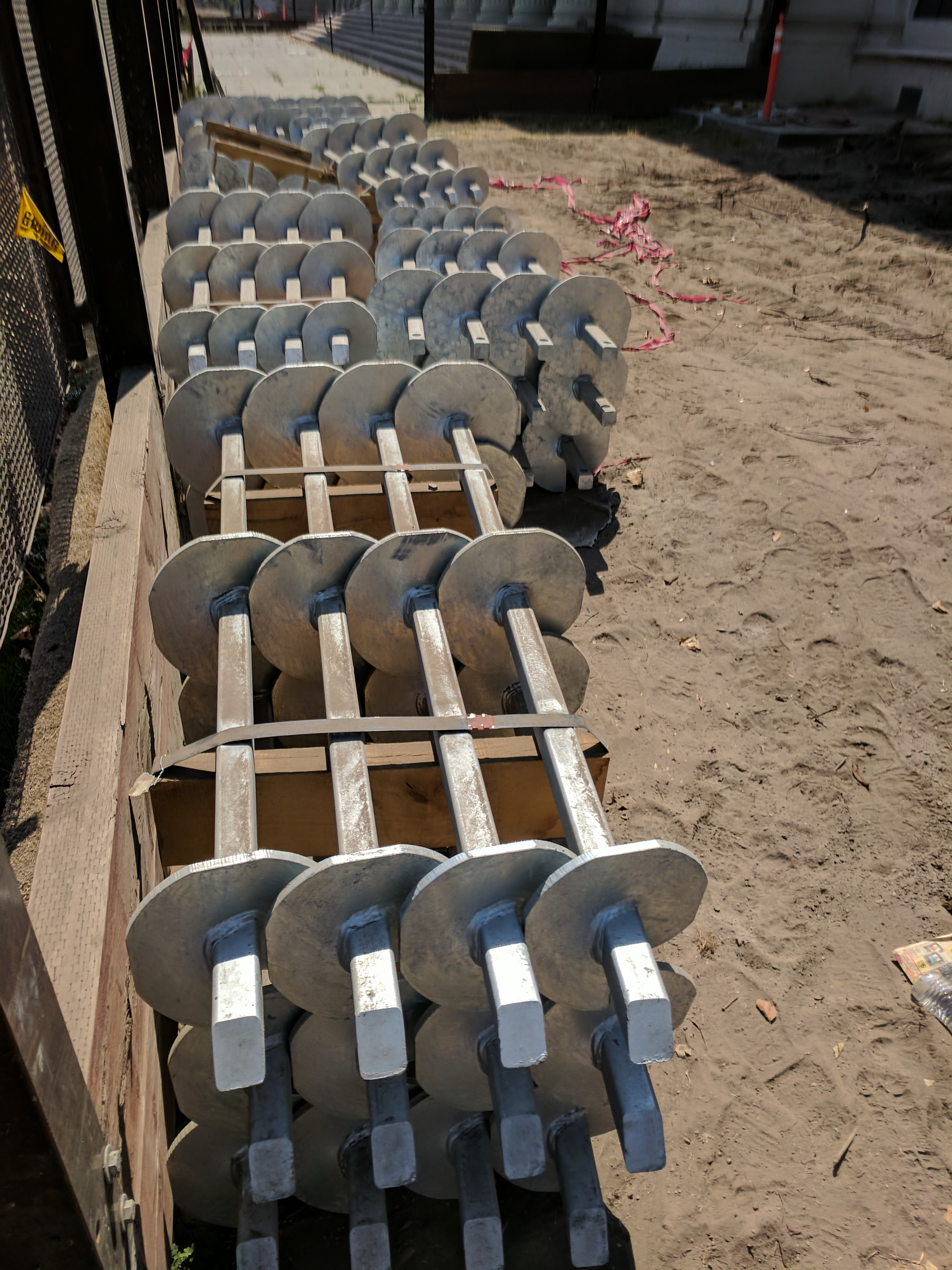
Helical anchors

Screw piles, sometimes referred to as screw-piles, screw piers, screw anchors, screw it foundations, ground screws, helical piles, helical piers, or helical anchors are a steel screw-in piling and ground anchoring system used for building deep foundations. Screw piles are typically manufactured from high-strength steel using varying sizes of tubular hollow sections with welded-on helical plates known as "flights".

The pile shaft transfers a structure's load into the pile, and is designed to meet both the application parameters and applicable building codes. The number of flights, their diameters, thicknesses, and position on the pile shaft, are all determined by a combination of:

1. The combined structure design load requirement
2. The geotechnical parameters
3. Environmental corrosion parameters
4. The minimum design life of the structure being supported or restrained.

Flights can be press-formed to a specified pitch or simply consist of flat plates welded at a specified pitch to the pile's shaft.

Although often used interchangeably, the terms helical anchors, helical piles and helical piers are not synonymous: Helical anchors consist of an extendable steel shaft with helical bearing plates. Piles or piers refer to strong base elements that withstand or transfer vertical/horizontal loads. Anchors are piles utilised only in tension, like restraining wall tiebacks or vertical ground anchors made to resist lateral forces (as on communications towers).

== Installation ==
Piles are generally installed using standard tracked or wheeled excavators with a hydraulic torque motor attachment which monitors the torque achieved during installation to verify the design. Machinery varies from skid-steer loaders to 5 tonne through 80 tonne excavators. Rotary hydraulic powerheads with torque capacities ranging from 5,000 N⋅m to 500,000 N⋅m are custom fitted using various boom configurations. Special drive attachments connect the screw pile to the machine. Correct installation techniques are important to meet engineered design load, building codes, and settlement outcomes. Incorrect techniques are likely to result in poor overall pile performance.

== Development ==
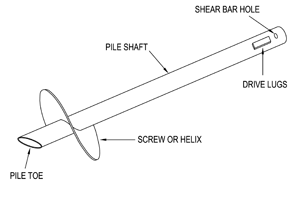
A screw pile

Screw piles were first described by the Irish civil engineer Alexander Mitchell in a paper in Civil Engineer and Architect's Journal in 1848; however, some decade after they had first been used. Screw foundations first appeared in the 1800s as foundations for screw-pile lighthouses, and were extensively used for piers in harbours. Between the 1850s through 1890s, more than 100 such lighthouses were erected on the east coast of the United States. Made originally from cast or wrought iron, they had limited bearing and tension capacities, and were subject to corrosion by saltwater.

More recently, composite technology offering significant advantages over steel in small screw pile manufacture and installed performance has been developed and patented.

== Modern use ==
Screw piles are used extensively, and their usage has extended from lighthouses to rail, telecommunications, roads, and numerous other industries where fast installation is required, or building work takes place close to existing structures.

Screw pile installations have also extended to residential applications, with many homeowners choosing a screw pile over other options. Some common applications for helical pile foundations include residential decks, sheds, cement pads, preformed stairs and grade beams.

Modern screw pile design is based on standard structural and geotechnical principles. Screw pile designers typically use their own design software, which has been developed through field testing of differing compression pile and tension anchor configurations in various soil profiles. Corrosion is addressed based on extended field trials, combined with worldwide databases on steel in ground corrosion. Typical helical piles with small-diameter pipes are able to restrain unfactored axial loads of up to 300 kN, uplift loads of up to 200 kN subject to the ground conditions and lateral loads of up to 25 kN. Newest emerging screw piles with large-diameter shaft pipes, which require large equipment to install, can withstand loads in excess of 2500 kN. Large load capacity screw piles may have various components such as flat half helices, Bisalloy cutting tips and helices, cap plates or rebar interfaces for connection to various concrete or steel structures.

Most industries use screw piling experts due to the cost efficiencies and, increasingly, the reduced environmental impact. "Screwing" the foundations into the ground means that there is less soil displacement so excess soil does not need to be transported from the site, saving on transportation costs and reducing the carbon footprint of the project.

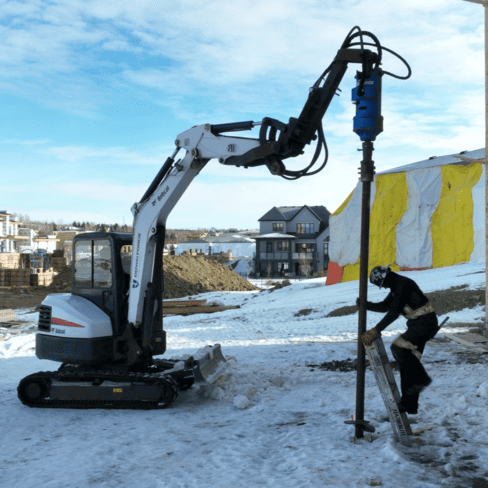
A small screw pile being installed by a compact tracked excavator

=== Benefits ===
The main benefits of screw pile include: shorter project times, ease of installation, little dependency on weather, ease of access, reduction of the carbon footprint, ease of removal when the foundations are no longer required, reusability, reduced risk to the workforce and reduced costs.

They are also suitable for both tensile and compression loads, so they are also used for masts, signs, and retaining structures.
