= Beach Lighthouse, Fleetwood =

Sandstone lighthouse in Fleetwood, Lancashire, England

Beach Lighthouse Range Front
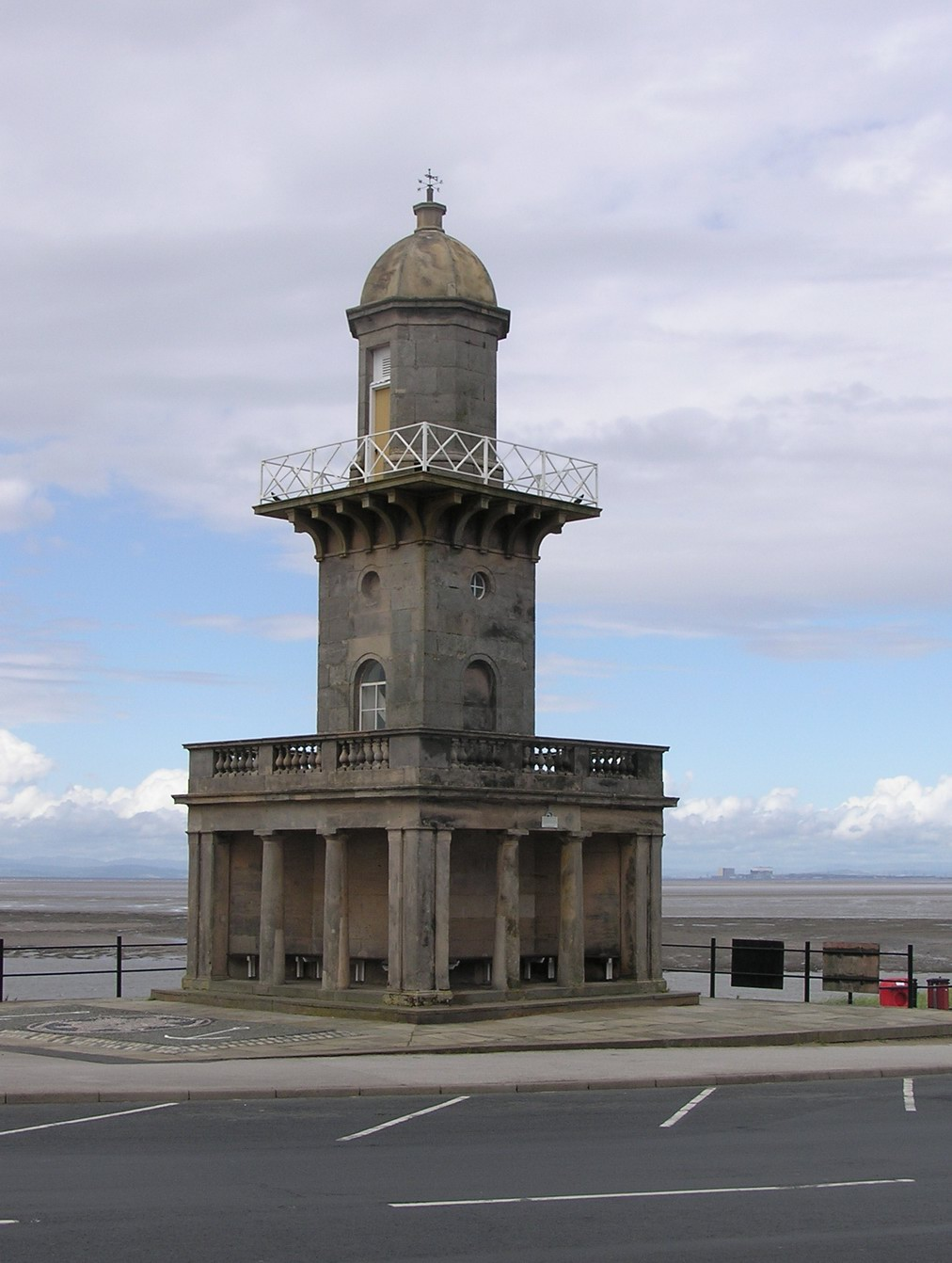
- The Beach Lighthouse, Fleetwood
- Location: Fleetwood; Lancashire; England; United Kingdom
- OS grid: SD3383848518
- Coordinates: 53.928554°N 3.009025°W

Tower
- Constructed: 1840
- Construction: sandstone tower
- Height: 13 metres (43 ft)
- Shape: square tower with octagonal lantern rising from a colonnaded 1-storey building
- Operator: Port of Fleetwood
- Heritage: Grade II listed building

Light
- Focal height: 14 metres (46 ft)
- Range: 6 nautical miles (11 km)
- Characteristic: Fl G 2s. light aligns with Upper Light guides shipping down Wyre Channel

Listed Building – Grade II
- Official name: Lower Lighthouse
- Designated: 26 April 1950
- Reference no.: 1362180

The Beach Lighthouse (also known as the Lower Light) is a 44-foot (13 m) tall sandstone lighthouse in Fleetwood, Lancashire, England.

== History ==
The lighthouse was designed in 1839 by Decimus Burton and Capt H.M. Denham. Burton had been commissioned three years previously by Sir Peter Hesketh Fleetwood as the architect of the new town of Fleetwood. Unusual for a lighthouse, it is in neoclassical style with a square colonnaded base, square tower, and octagonal lantern and gallery.

The Lower Light stands on Fleetwood sea front and was built with its counterpart—the Upper Light, or Pharos Lighthouse—to provide a navigational guide to shipping entering the Wyre estuary. Together the lights provide a leading line when the Pharos Light is directly above that of the Lower Light. They provide a range of about 12 nautical miles (22 km). In turn they point to the Wyre Light on the North Wharf Bank, 2 nautical miles (3.7 km) offshore.

Both lighthouses were first illuminated 1 December 1840. Each was run off the town's gas supply, with a single parabolic reflector placed behind the burner; they were later converted to electricity.

The Beach Lighthouse was designated a Grade II listed building by English Heritage on 26 April 1950. The lighthouse is managed by the Port of Fleetwood.

== See also ==
- Pharos Lighthouse, Fleetwood
- List of lighthouses in England
- Listed buildings in Fleetwood

== Sources ==
- H N Denham, Sailing directions from Port Lynas to Liverpool... Mawdsley, Liverpool, 1840
