= Helena, Louisiana =

Unincorporated community in Louisiana, U.S.

Coordinates: 31°52′17″N 91°23′36″W

Helena is an unincorporated community in Tensas Parish, Louisiana, United States.
