= North Euston Hotel =

Hotel in Fleetwood, Lancashire, England

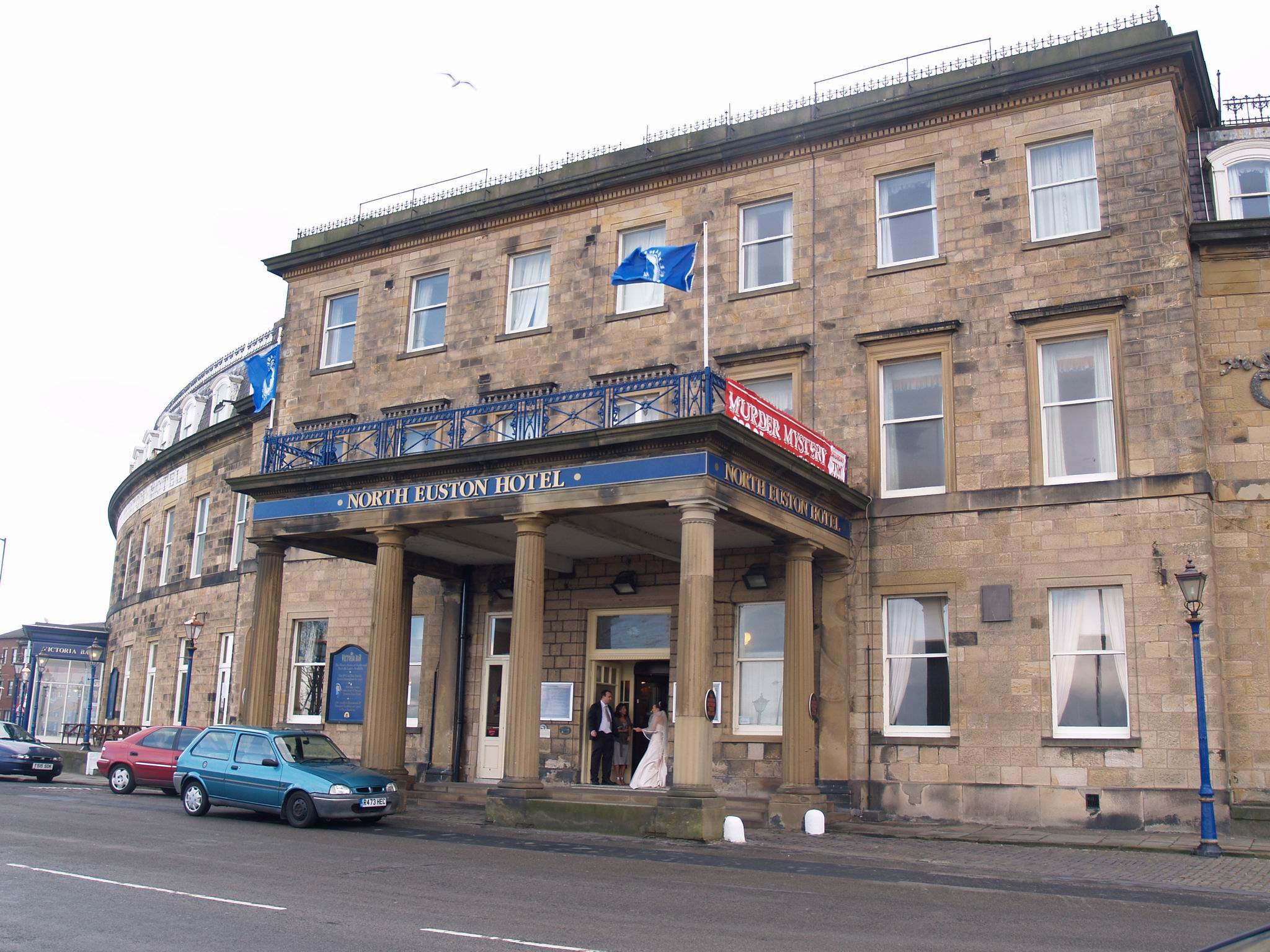

- Location within Fleetwood

General information
- Location: Fleetwood, Lancashire, England
- Coordinates: 53°55′40.8″N 3°0′33.12″W
- Opening: 1841
- Owner: Spearman family

Design and construction
- Architect: Decimus Burton

Listed Building – Grade II
- Designated: 26 April 1950
- Reference no.: 1362181

The North Euston Hotel is a hotel in Fleetwood, Lancashire, England. It was built between 1840 and 1841, to a design by Decimus Burton. During the second half of the 19th century, the building was used by the War Department as a School of Musketry; by the end of the century, it had reverted to its original purpose. The hotel has been designated a Grade II listed building by English Heritage.

== History ==
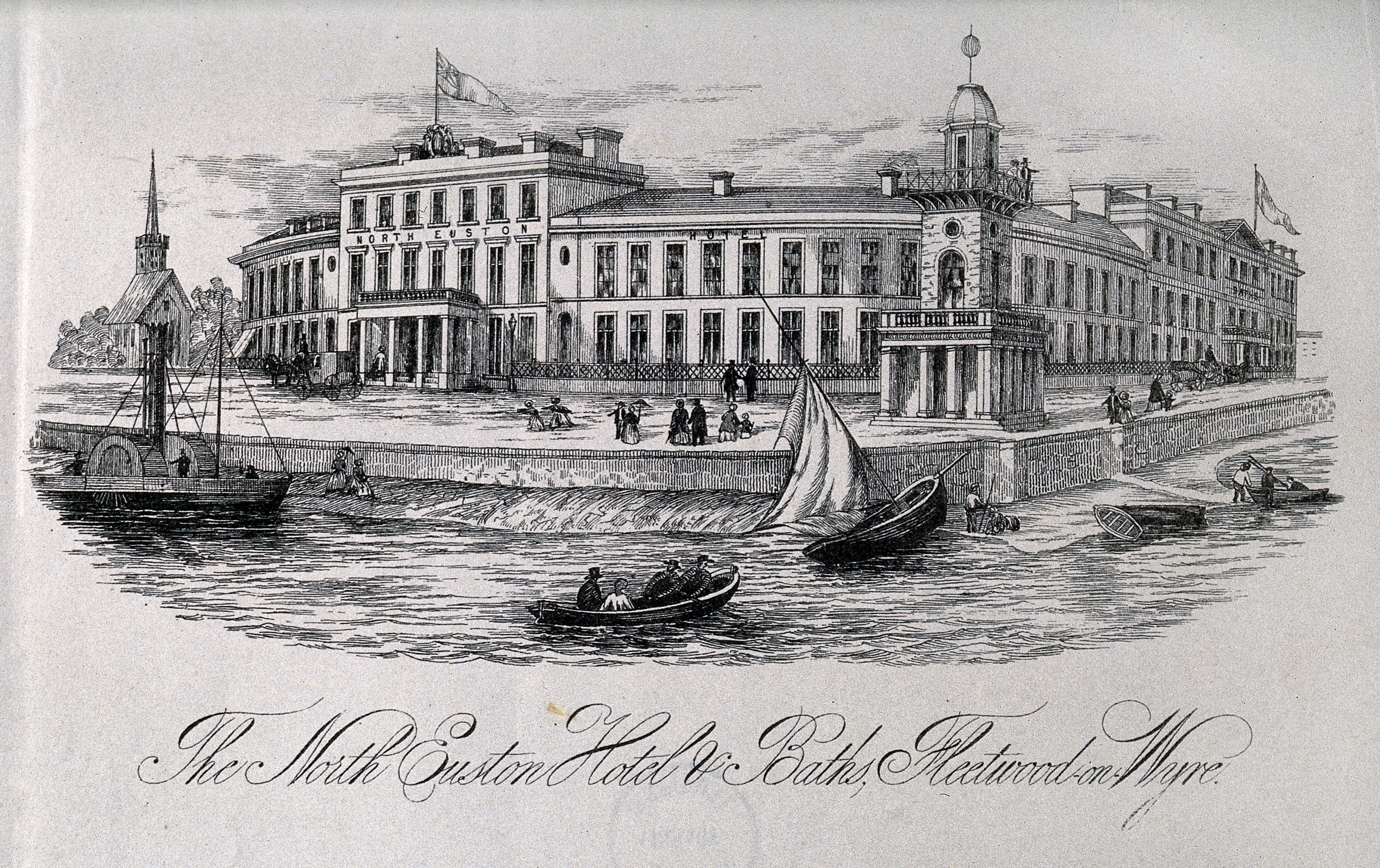
An engraving of the hotel in its early years

Fleetwood was a 19th-century planned town, developed by local landowner Peter Hesketh-Fleetwood. Inspired by southern English seaside resorts like St Leonards-on-Sea, Hesketh-Fleetwood employed architect Decimus Burton to lay out his new town and design the main buildings. Hesketh-Fleetwood intended that Fleetwood would be an important stop for rail passengers travelling from London to Scotland, for in the 1840s, there was no railway over the Lake District hills and passengers would be able to disembark at Fleetwood before taking a boat to Scotland. A hotel was a vital part of this plan, and since rail passengers would be embarking at London Euston, Hesketh-Fleetwood decided to name it the North Euston Hotel.

Burton designed the hotel as a focal point in the town. Construction started in 1840, and it opened the following year. A regatta was held in celebration of the hotel's opening in August 1841. The hotel's first manager was a Corsican man called Xenon Vantini. By the 1850s, a direct rail route to Scotland had been built, ending Hesketh-Fleetwood's hopes of Fleetwood becoming a major transport hub. The town's tourist industry was failing and the North Euston was sold to the government. Between 1861 and 1867, the War Department used it as a School of Musketry; later, with additional buildings, it was converted into Euston Barracks. In 1898, the North Euston reverted to its original use. The seldom used bath houses at the rear of the hotel had been demolished by 1900.

On 26 April 1950, English Heritage designated the hotel a Grade II listed building. The Grade II designation—the lowest of the three grades—is for buildings that are "nationally important and of special interest".

The hotel overlooks Euston Gardens, which sits between North Albert Street and The Esplanade.

== Architecture ==
The hotel is built of ashlar with slate roofs. It has a curved plan, with a front façade that stretches approximately 300 yards (270 m). The north and south wings have two regular storeys with a mansard roof, and dormers providing accommodation on the third floor. The central portion has three full storeys. The north wing, which faces along the Esplanade, curves almost a full 90 degrees, while the south wing is shorter, curving roughly 45 degrees. At the front of the building there is a porte-cochère (porch) supported by fluted Roman Doric columns.

== Reception ==
The correspondent from Bradshaw's Manchester Journal visited the hotel on its opening in 1841 and was clearly impressed, describing the crescent-shaped building as "spacious and handsome" and "the entire establishment . . . as perhaps unequalled by any hotel out of the Metropolis". The interior had ball rooms, a concert hall, billiard rooms and "every luxury that can be coveted".

When in use as The School of Musketry, the officers' quarters were described as "unsurpassed by any in the kingdom" and the building's convex frontage "commands a glorious view" over the Wyre and Morecambe Bay to the Lake District.

== See also ==
- Listed buildings in Fleetwood
