= Pharos Lighthouse, Fleetwood =

Pharos Lighthouse
- Pictured in 2023
- Location: Fleetwood; Lancashire; England
- OS grid: SD3393748289
- Coordinates: 53.926530°N 3.007511°W

Tower
- Constructed: 1840
- Construction: sandstone tower
- Height: 27 metres (89 ft)
- Shape: tapered cylindrical tower with balcony, lantern and dome
- Markings: unpainted tower, white balcony rail
- Operator: Port of Fleetwood
- Heritage: Grade II listed building

Light
- Focal height: 28 metres (92 ft)
- Range: 12 nautical miles (22 km)
- Characteristic: Fl G 4s. visible only on the range line

Listed Building – Grade II
- Official name: Upper Lighthouse or Pharos
- Designated: 31 March 1978
- Reference no.: 1072397

The Pharos Lighthouse (also known as the Upper Lighthouse) is a 93-foot (28 m) tall Runcorn red sandstone lighthouse situated in Fleetwood, Lancashire, England. It was designed in 1839 by Decimus Burton and Capt H.M. Denham. Burton has been commissioned three years previously by Sir Peter Hesketh Fleetwood as the architect of the new town of Fleetwood. Construction was completed in 1840. Unusually for a functioning British lighthouse, it stands in the middle of a residential street (Pharos Street). Though officially named the 'Upper Lighthouse', it has been known as the 'Pharos' since its construction, after the celebrated ancient lighthouse Pharos of Alexandria.

The lighthouse was designed and constructed in conjunction with the much shorter (34 feet (10 m)) Lower Lighthouse (also known as Beach Lighthouse) which stands on Fleetwood sea front. The lighthouses are designed to be used as a pair to guide shipping through the treacherous sandbanks of the Wyre estuary. The light from the Pharos should be kept immediately above the light from the Lower for safe passage down the channel. Both lighthouses were first illuminated on 1 December 1840. Each was run off the town's gas supply, with a single parabolic reflector placed behind the burner; they were later converted to electricity. The lamp is approximately 104 feet (32 m) above sea level, giving a range of about 12 nautical miles (22 km).

For many years, the lighthouse was painted a cream and red colour, but in the late 1970s the original sandstone was again exposed. The Fleetwood terminal loop of the Blackpool tramway runs past the foot of the lighthouse. The lighthouse is managed by the Port of Fleetwood. The interior is closed to the general public.

== See also ==
- List of lighthouses in England
- Listed buildings in Fleetwood
