= Victoria Pier =

Victoria Pier may refer to:

- Fleetwood Pier
- Rhyl Pier
- Royal Pier, Southampton
- South Pier, Blackpool
- Victoria Pier, Colwyn Bay
- Victoria Pier, Kingston upon Hull
