= Tim Duncan (disambiguation) =

Tim Duncan (born 1976) is an American former professional basketball player.

Tim Duncan may also refer to:

- Tim Duncan (American football) (born 1979), American football player
- Tim A. Duncan, English composer
- Tim Duncan, singer in the Southern gospel quartet Ernie Haase & Signature Sound
