= Fleetwood =

Town in Lancashire, England

Coordinates: 53.922°N 3.012°W

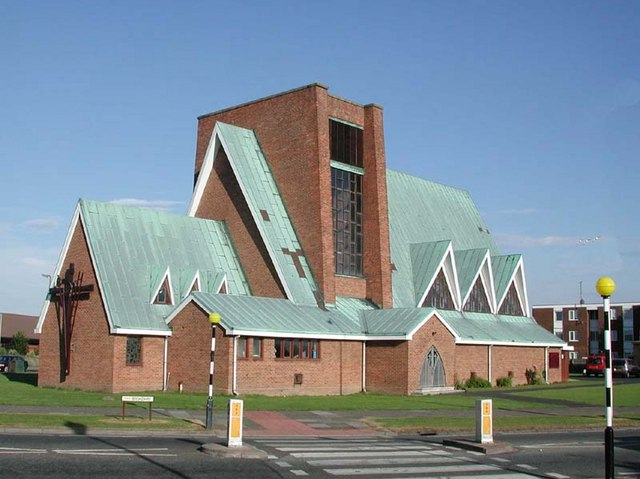
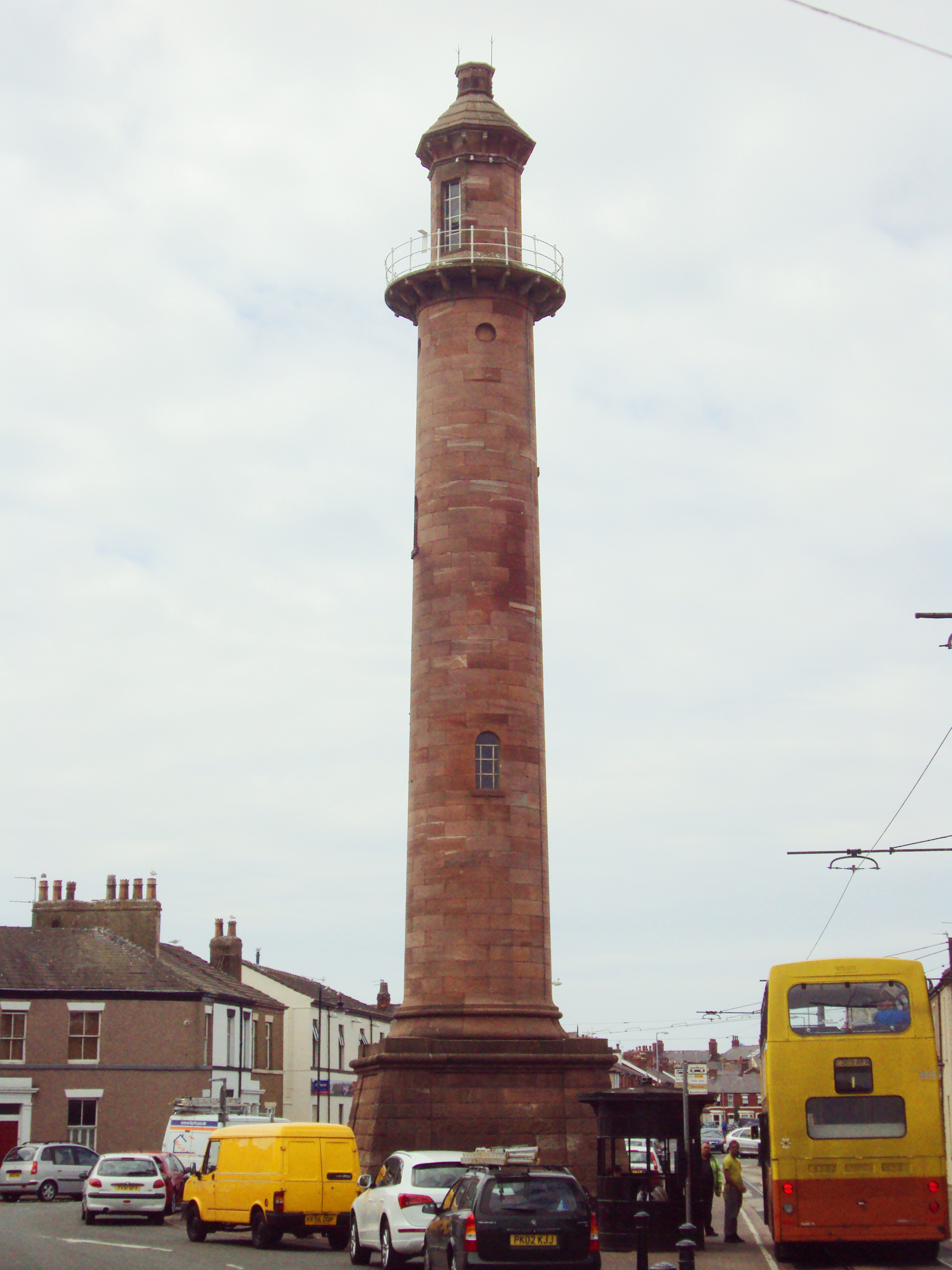
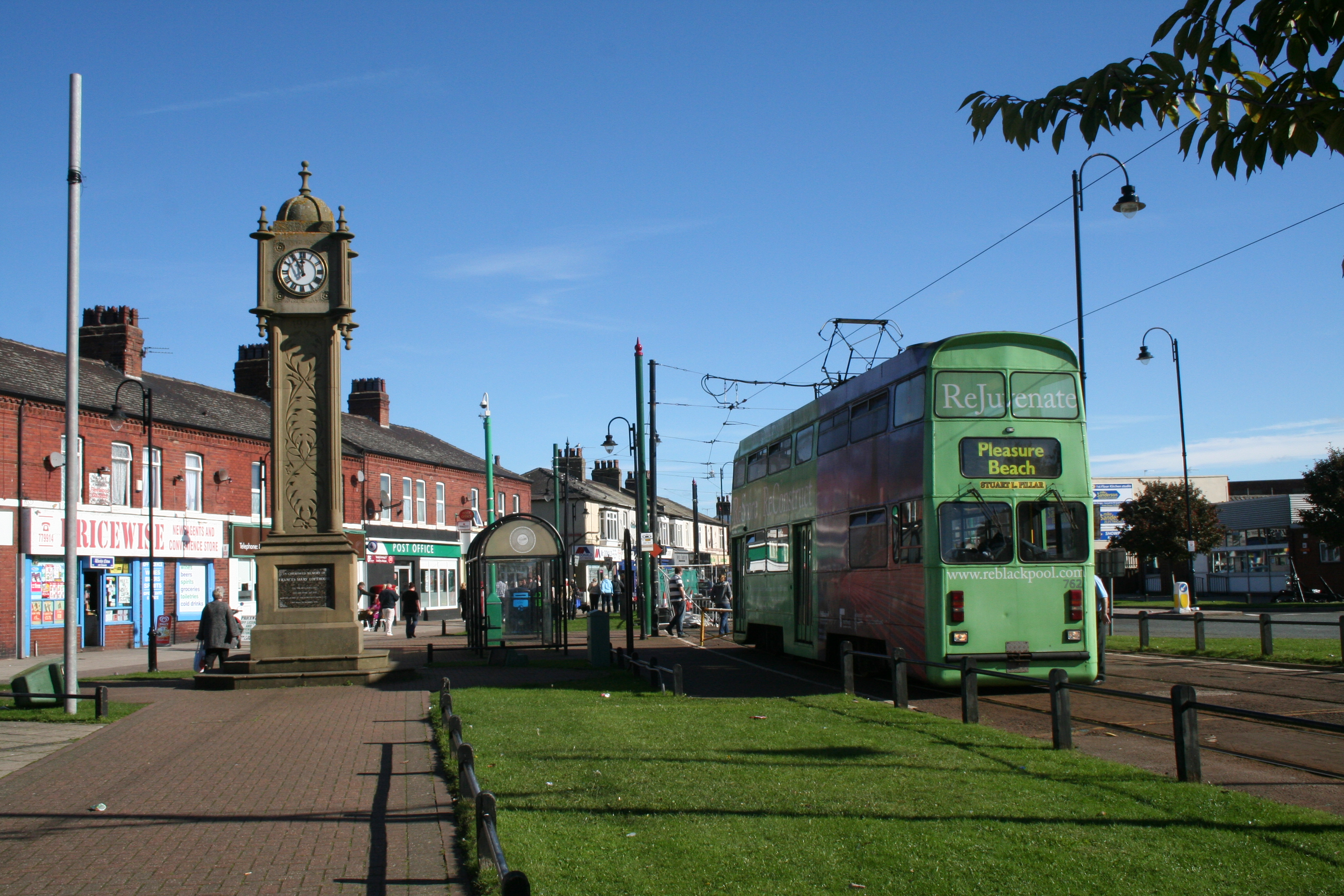
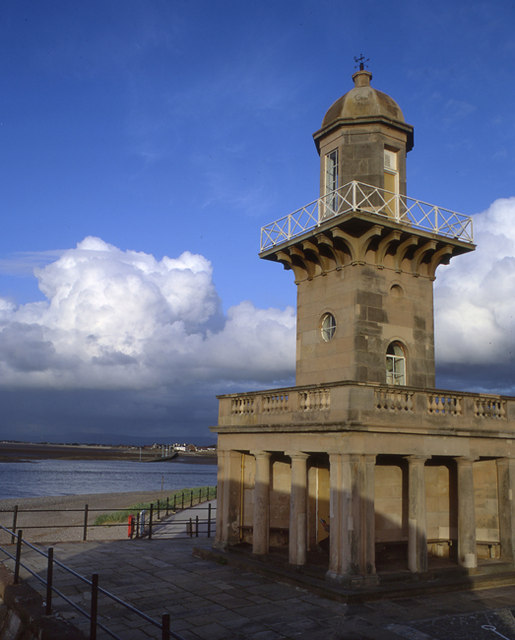
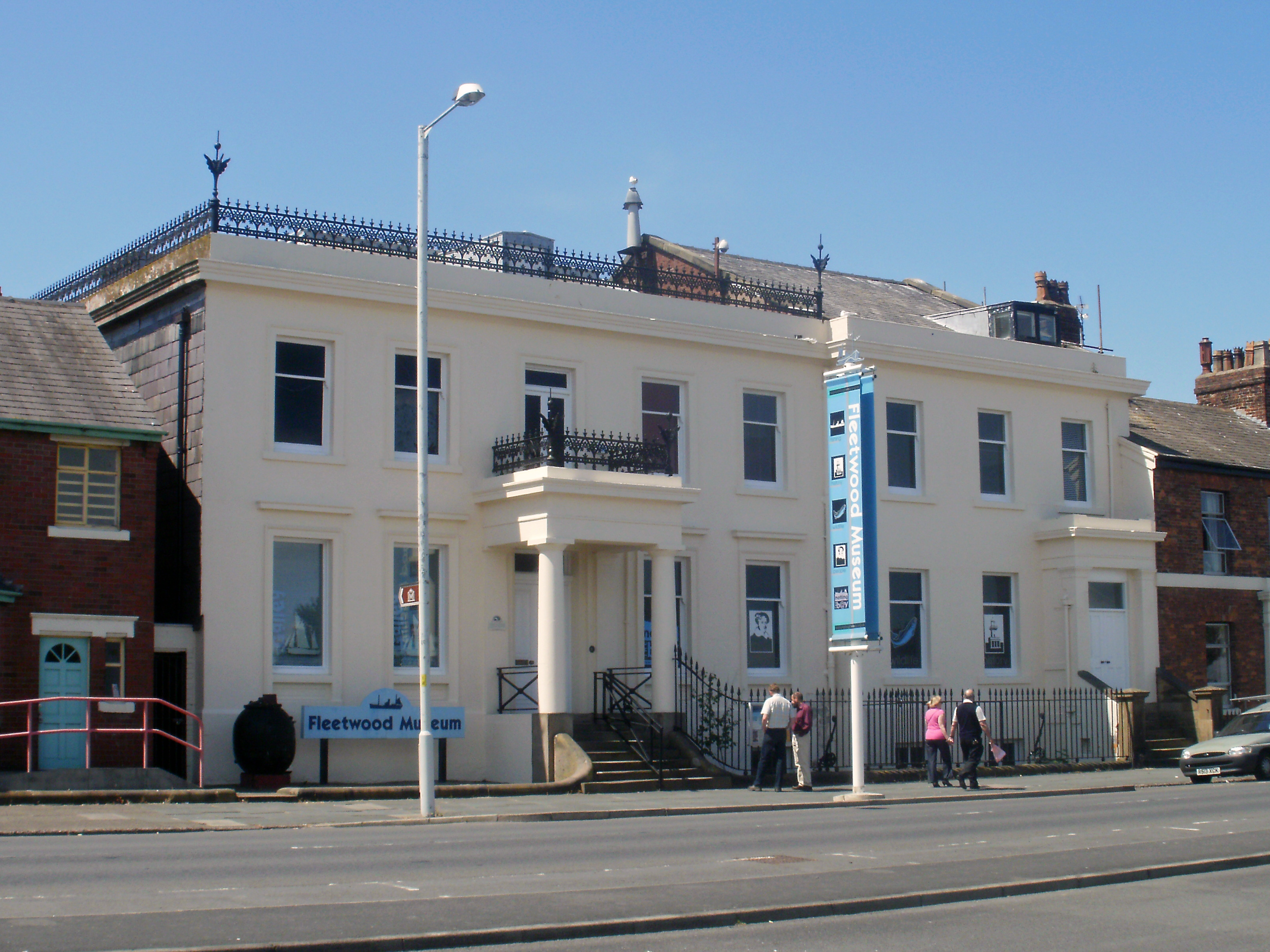
- St Nicholas Church Upper Light Ash Street Tram Station Lower Light Fleetwood Museum

- Location in Wyre Borough Location on the Fylde Location on Morecambe Bay Location of town centre in Fleetwood Location within Lancashire
- Population: 26,232 (2021)
- OS grid reference: SD333479
- Civil parish: Fleetwood
- District: Wyre
- Shire county: Lancashire
- Region: North West
- Country: England
- Sovereign state: United Kingdom
- Post town: FLEETWOOD
- Postcode district: FY7
- Dialling code: 01253
- Police: Lancashire
- Fire: Lancashire
- Ambulance: North West
- UK Parliament: Blackpool North and Fleetwood
- Website: www.fleetwoodtowncouncil.org.uk

Fleetwood is a coastal town in the Borough of Wyre in Lancashire, England, at the northwest corner of the Fylde. It had a population of 26,232 at the 2021 census.

Fleetwood acquired its modern character in the 1830s, when the principal landowner Peter Hesketh-Fleetwood, High Sheriff and MP, conceived an ambitious plan to re-develop the town to make it a busy seaport and railway spur. He commissioned the Victorian architect Decimus Burton to design a number of substantial civic buildings, including two lighthouses. Hesketh-Fleetwood's transport terminus schemes failed to materialise. The town expanded greatly in the first half of the 20th century with the growth of the fishing industry, and passenger ferries to the Isle of Man, to become a deep-sea fishing port.

Decline of the fishing industry began in the 1960s, hastened by the Cod Wars with Iceland, though fish processing is still a major economic activity in Fleetwood. The town's most significant employer today is Lofthouse of Fleetwood, manufacturer of the lozenge Fisherman's Friend which is exported around the world.

== History ==
The area around Fleetwood has been populated since ancient times, and an Iron Age settlement was discovered at Bourne Hill (just south of present-day Fleetwood) in 2007. By the time of the Roman conquest of Britain, the area was home to a tribe known as the Setantii and the coast around Fleetwood has often been suggested as a location for the lost Setantiorum Portus ('the port of the Setantii') named by Ptolemy in his 2nd century AD work, Geographia. Ptolemy lists the port as being just south of the Moricambe Aestuarium (Morecambe Bay) and North of the Belisama Aestuarium (possibly the Ribble Estuary). The Roman road from Ribchester also appears to make a sharp northwesterly turn towards Fleetwood after Kirkham (12 miles (19 km) to the southeast).

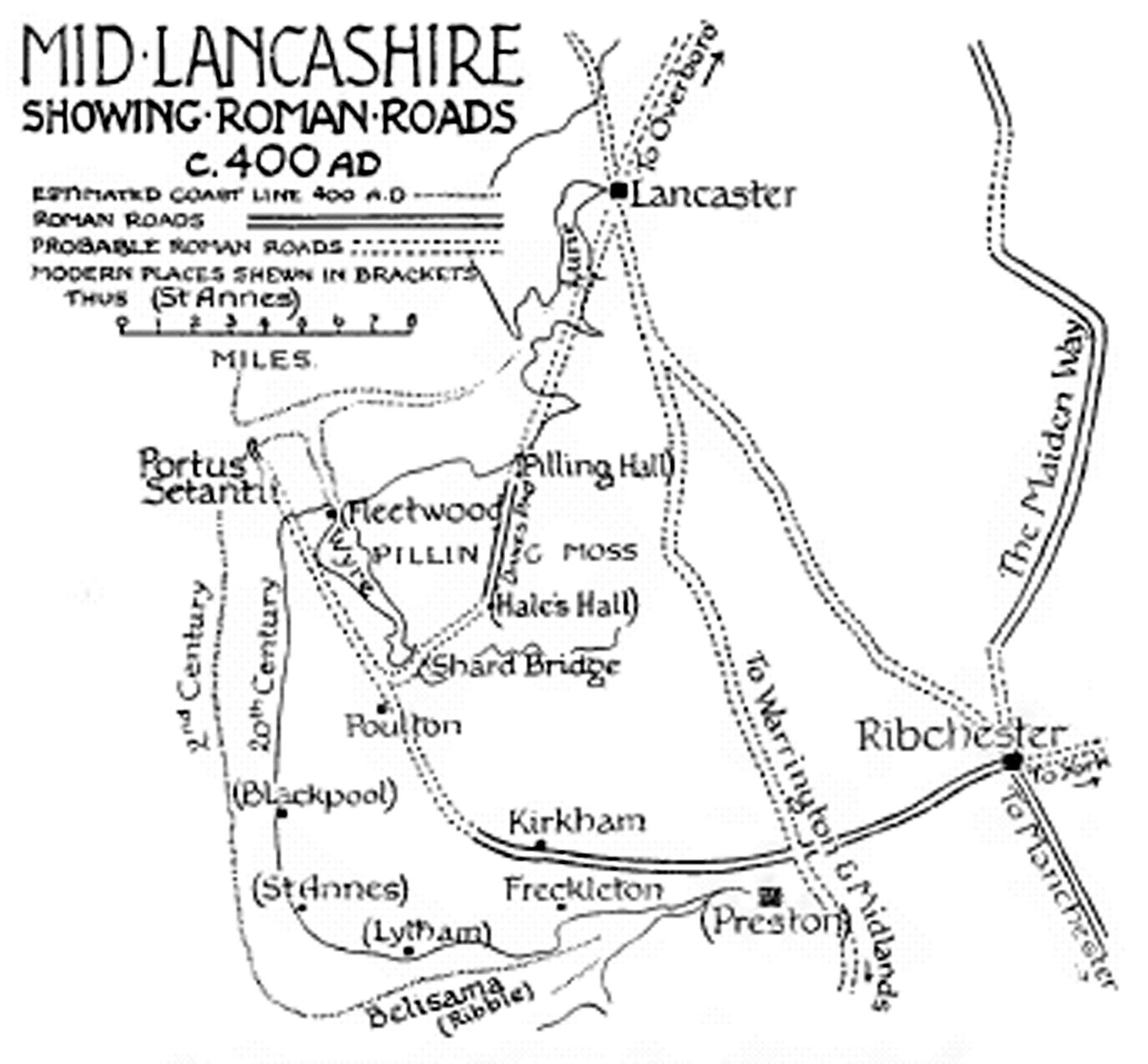
A speculative map of Lancashire (circa. AD 400) showing the proposed Roman road leading to modern Fleetwood

There is evidence that both banks of the River Wyre were occupied during the Danish invasions of the 9th and 10th centuries. Place names such as Skippool and Rossall to the west, where present-day Fleetwood stands, and Hackinsall on the east, can be traced to Viking settlers there. By the time of the Domesday Book in 1086, the land on which Fleetwood now stands was part of the Hundred of Amounderness.

A manor house at present-day Rossall, in the southwest of the town, was in the possession of the Allen family by the time of Henry VIII. The Allens were prominent Roman Catholics, and Henry VIII repossessed the land. Cardinal William Allen was born at the manor house in 1532. It was ultimately sold to Thomas Fleetwood, comptroller of the Royal Mint, whose son Edmund, expanded the house into Rossall Hall. The land remained in the Fleetwood family for 300 years.

=== 19th century ===
By the 1830s, the house and estate was in the ownership of Edmund's descendant Peter Hesketh, High Sheriff of Lancashire and MP for Preston. A man of somewhat liberal views for his time, Hesketh believed that the sheltered harbour and views over Morecambe Bay gave the area the makings of a busy seaport and popular resort for the less-affluent. With no rail link between London and Scotland, he envisaged Fleetwood as the transfer point between the railway and the steamers to Scotland, and set about encouraging a railway link from Preston. With a new career in parliament to prepare for, he engaged Frederick Kemp as his agent. He originally considered naming the new town Wyreton or New Liverpool, but after changing his name to Peter Hesketh-Fleetwood in 1831, he settled on the name Fleetwood. After some delays, he recruited the prominent architect Decimus Burton, whose work in St Leonard's-on-Sea he had admired, to lay out what would be the first planned town of the Victorian era. The plans were complete by 1835, and construction of the first buildings and the railway line began in 1836.

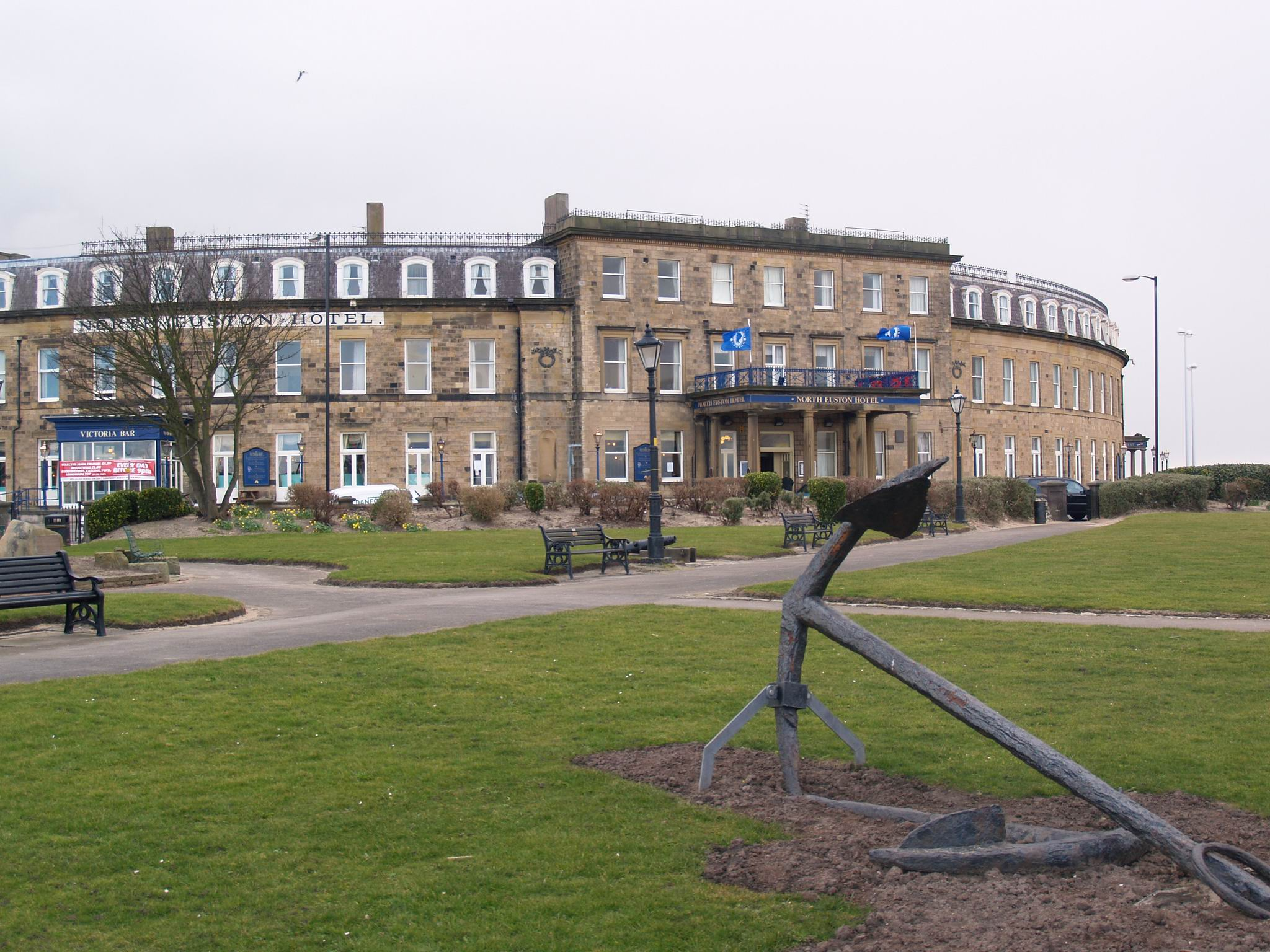
North Euston Hotel (1841) as seen from Euston Park

Burton's plan was to use the largest of the sand-dunes on the north-facing shore as the focus of a half-wheel street layout. This was landscaped, and became known as the Mount. It served as the hub of Burton's half-wheel design, the main residential streets acted as the spokes, and the main commerce area of Dock Street was the rim of the wheel. The oldest surviving building in the town, once the custom house, later the town hall and latterly Fleetwood Museum, dates from 1836 and housing from as early as 1838 still exists in the town. The crown jewel was the North Euston Hotel, built in 1841, a fine semi-circular building overlooking the bay and the river's estuary. The hotel was built to serve overnight guests making the railway journey from Euston, and was close to the point of departure for the steamers to Scotland. This journey was made by Queen Victoria in 1847, but by the mid-1850s the completion of the western railway link between London and Scotland over Shap Fell rendered Fleetwood's role as a transport terminus obsolete.

Upper (Pharos) Lighthouse (1840)

Burton designed two lighthouses for the town: The Upper Lighthouse, usually referred to as the Pharos (after the Pharos of Alexandria in Egypt, one of the Seven Wonders of the Ancient World), can be seen for 13 miles (21 km) and Beach Lighthouse is visible for 9 miles (14 km). Both opened in 1840. A third lighthouse, Wyre Light, built in 1839–40 by blind engineer Alexander Mitchell, offshore on the northeast corner of North Wharf, was the first screw pile lighthouse to be built in Great Britain. Fleetwood is the only town in the United Kingdom to possess three lighthouses and the two within the town itself remain fully operational. Wyre Light has now fallen into a state of disrepair.

Fleetwood Market, still a prominent permanent market, was established in 1840.

By 1838, Hesketh-Fleetwood had run into serious financial difficulties, with costs for the railway in particular ultimately exceeding £300,000. He had numerous financial arguments with Frederick Kemp, who borrowed against the estate revenues to finance the expansion of the town, and was suspected of taking financial advantage of Sir Peter. Hesketh-Fleetwood became short of cash and was forced to mortgage his properties. Depressed, he gradually withdrew from the project, and by 1844 he had been obliged to sell much of his estate. He leased Rossall Hall itself to the Church of England, which intended to set up a boarding school as a North of England equivalent of Marlborough School. Under the auspices of Rev. St. Vincent Beechey, the vicar of Fleetwood, it was to become Rossall School. Virtually bankrupt, Hesketh-Fleetwood retired to Brighton, giving up his parliamentary obligations in 1847. Meanwhile, Kemp's influence expanded. He had set up the Fleetwood Estates Company to manage the land, and the North Lancashire Steam Navigation Company in 1843 to manage the expanding steamer trade. However, by the late 1850s, the combination of the new western railway route and the rise of neighbouring Blackpool as a prominent seaside resort signalled a decline in the town's fortunes.

Fleetwood Docks Act 1864
- Act of Parliament
- Parliament of the United Kingdom
- Long title: An Act for the Construction of an Embankment, Docks, and other Works, and the Reclamation and Acquisition of Lands near Fleetwood in the County Palatine of Lancaster; and for other Purposes.
- Citation: 27 & 28 Vict. c. clxxxvii

Dates
- Royal assent: 14 July 1864

Text of statute as originally enacted

Fleetwood Docks Act 1871
- Act of Parliament
- Parliament of the United Kingdom
- Long title: An Act to revive and extend the powers granted by "The Fleetwood Docks Act, 1864" and to enable the Lancashire and Yorkshire Railway Company to exercise those powers; and for other purposes.
- Citation: 34 & 35 Vict. c. lxx

Dates
- Royal assent: 29 June 1871

Text of statute as originally enacted

From the 1860s Fleetwood expanded its port activities. Steamers began pleasure and commercial services to the Isle of Man, Ardrossan and Belfast. 1/2 mile (800 m) of stone quays were built along the river front, and the railway line was extended to the steamer pier opposite Queen's Terrace, where the imposing new railway station was built in 1883. The port was still mainly a cargo terminal at this time, but the fishing industry began to grow as vessels expanded their catchment area from the Irish Sea fishing grounds first fished in the 1840s, to the haddock grounds of the North Atlantic Ocean. At this time, all the fishing vessels out of Fleetwood were sail-powered fishing smacks, few being over 40 tons deadweight. The Fleetwood Docks Act 1864 (27 & 28 Vict. c. clxxxvii) enabled the construction of a dock and embankment for both fishing and general cargo. Work on what was to become Wyre Dock began in 1869 but was suspended for financial reasons. A second act of Parliament, the Fleetwood Docks Act 1871 (34 & 35 Vict. c. lxx) gave construction authority to the Lancashire and Yorkshire Railway Company, under chief engineers Sir John Hawkshaw and Harrison Hayter. Construction itself, by John Aird & Sons, was completed in 1877. Heavy industry came to the area in the late 1880s with the construction of a salt-processing works on the southeastern edge of the town by the Fleetwood Salt Co. Ltd, using salt mined in Preesall, across the river.

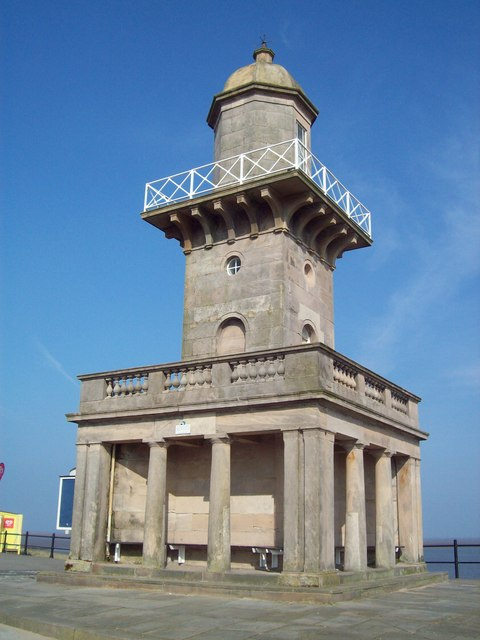
Lower Lighthouse, by Decimus Burton, 1840, is visible for 9 miles (14 km).

By the early 1890s, the construction and expansion of rival cargo ports in the North West and the building of the Manchester Ship Canal heralded the decline of Fleetwood's prominence as a cargo port. However, at the same time this was more than offset by a period of rapid expansion of the fishing industry, signalled by the launch in 1891 of the first steam powered trawler, the Lark. All the other major fishing ports in Britain, Hull, Grimsby and Aberdeen, were on the east coast, so there was a competitive advantage for a west-coast port with good rail links. By the start of the 20th century, Fleetwood's position as one of the three major fishing ports in England was cemented. James Marr brought a fleet of steam trawlers to Fleetwood and actively started to change the port by selectively fishing for hake, which until then had been treated as a much less desirable catch. Many of the houses in the old area of town around the Mount and Lord Street were built in the 1890s. In keeping with the thriving economy, these terraced houses were large for their era. An electric tramway link to Blackpool was constructed in the 1890s and remains operational to this day. The trams were routed along East Street and West Street (now Lord Street and North Albert Street) rather than Dock Street, and commercial trade followed, making those streets the commercial centre of the town. Fleetwood is the only town in Britain with trams running the full length of its main street, sharing road-space with cars. The docks were expanded in 1908 with the construction of the Fish Dock, accessible through Wyre Dock and still used today for the inshore fleet. Plans for a pier were first made in the 1890s but building did not start until 1909 and it was opened in 1910. It was the last new seaside pier to be built in the United Kingdom.

=== 20th century ===
By the 1920s, the fishing industry was at its height, employing over 9,000 people. Over the next few years, the sea front along the north shore was developed in resort fashion, to encourage visitors for whom the brashness of Blackpool was too daunting. The Marine Hall entertainment complex (1935), golf course (1931) and Model Yacht Pond (1932) all date from that era. In the 1920s, the salt works, by then owned by the United Alkali Company (after 1926, part of ICI), was considerably expanded, and became an ammonia-processing plant. ICI built an adjacent chemical processing plant, known as ICI Hillhouse. ICI became the town's third-largest employer, after the fishing and tourism industries. The first fully automated telephone exchange in Britain was put into operation to serve the town on 15 July 1922.

A huge flood in October 1927 put 90% of the area of the town under water; only the higher areas around the Mount escaped. Additional housing was built in the 1920s and 1930s in the less-developed central areas of the town, and a further development boom occurred in the 1960s, in the lower lying western portion of the town (Larkholme). Many industries related to fishing grew up along the rail corridor on the eastern side of the town, and a number of unrelated industries also moved to the area to take advantage of the availability of labour.

By the 1960s, however, Fleetwood had begun to decline economically. The last ferry to the Isle of Man sailed in 1961, although the sailings have been revived periodically since. The main railway station was closed in 1966 as a result of the Beeching cuts, and the passenger terminus was moved to Wyre Dock railway station. That, in turn, was closed in 1970, as the branch line from Poulton was taken out of service. Additional light industry developed along the former railway route.

The rise of package holidays abroad led to fewer visitors to British resort towns. As Blackpool expanded its attractions, fewer day visitors came to Fleetwood, and as transport became more efficient, more overnight visitors became day visitors. The Hillhouse plant was heavily cut back and was finally closed in 1999. Most serious, however, was the collapse of the fishing industry, which was largely destroyed in the late 1960s and early 1970s by the Cod Wars, a dispute over fishing rights between Iceland and the UK. As Fleetwood's trawlers mainly fished the North Atlantic in search of cod, the loss of the fishing grounds hit the town hard. The last deep-sea trawler left the town in 1982 and now only inshore fishing boats use the port, although trawlers registered in other places can still be seen taking advantage of the fish market. Fish is still a big industry in the town, though the jobs are mainly in processing rather than fishing. A pair of bronze figures on the promenade by the pier depicts the idea of families welcoming back the fishermen from sea.

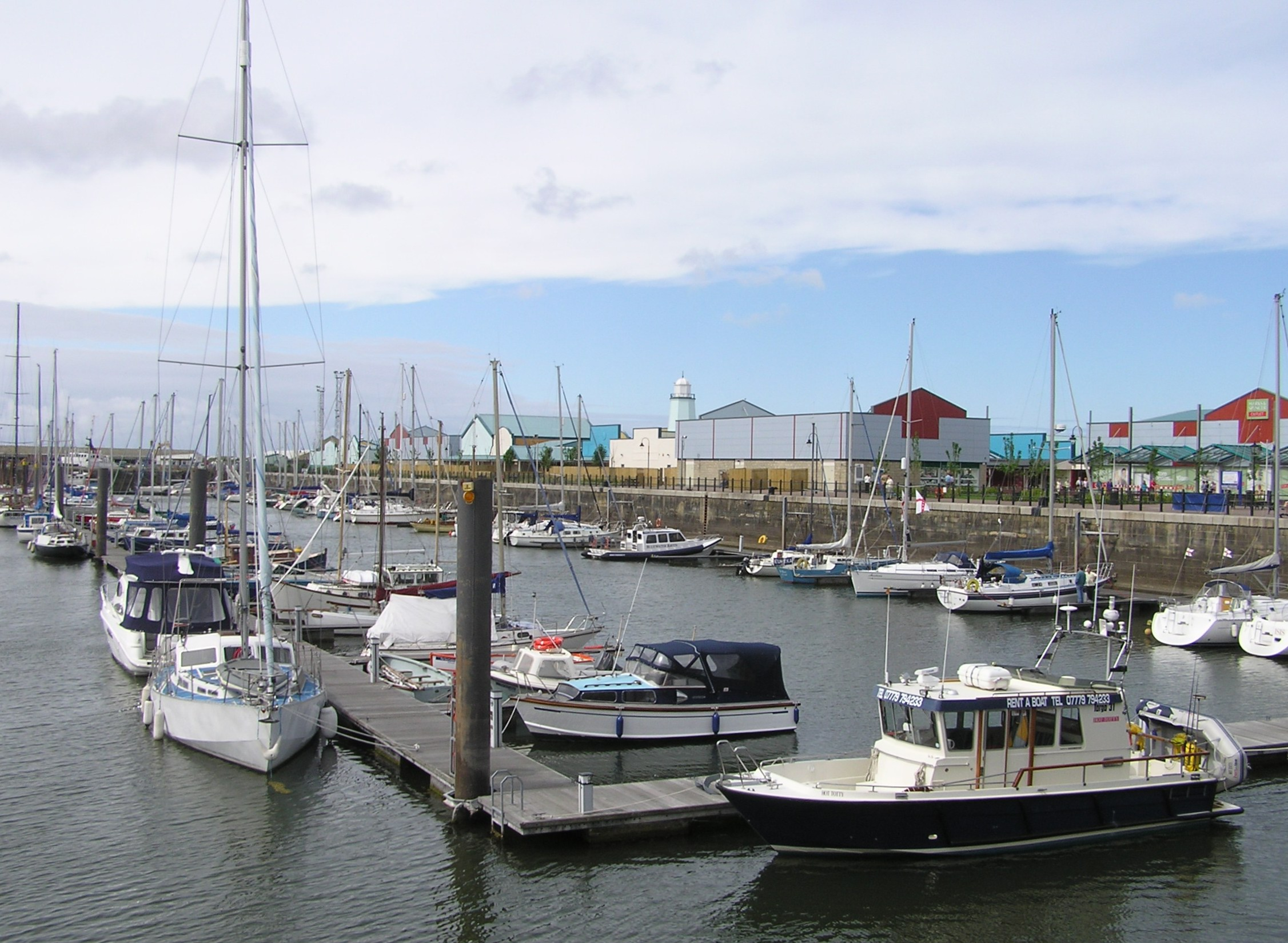
Fleetwood Freeport and Marina (1995) is built on the site of the former Wyre Dock.

In 1973, the area around the old railway station was developed into a container port facility, with P&O operating a container service to Larne in Northern Ireland. In 1975, this became a Roll-on/roll-off service. This development led indirectly to some renewal of the then largely derelict Dock Street area, and improved road access to the town to support the container traffic. Twice-daily container service continued until 2004 when Stena Line bought the route and increased the service to three times a day. In December 2010, Stena Line announced that the service would be withdrawn at the end of 2010, with the loss of 140 jobs.

Since the 1970s, there have been several attempts to enhance Fleetwood's economic profile, In 1995, the now-deserted Wyre Dock was developed into a marina. The derelict dock landing area was developed into Freeport, a retail centre, and housing has been built at the north end of the marina. In July 2007, a new "Masterplan" for revitalising the waterfront and town centre was submitted to the Wyre Borough Council.

In 1996, Fleetwood could be seen in "A High Profile", an episode of Hetty Wainthropp Investigates. Several buildings along The Esplanade were used, one of Fleetwood's churches and others.

== Governance ==
Since the Local Government Act 1972, effective 1 April 1974, Fleetwood has been part of the Borough of Wyre, together with the neighbouring communities of Thornton Cleveleys and Poulton-le-Fylde, the Over Wyre villages and Garstang. The administrative headquarters is in Poulton-le-Fylde. The borough is a constituent part of Lancashire County Council. Although Wyre Council has a Conservative majority (thirty out of a total of fifty councillors), nine of Fleetwood's councillors belong to Labour two to Conservatives. Prior to 1974, Fleetwood had been a municipal borough since 1933, and from 1894 to 1933, an urban district. The town is divided into five wards, Mount, Pharos, Warren, Park and Rossall.

A Fleetwood parish council (known as Fleetwood Town Council) was established following a referendum in June 2009. The boundaries of the parish are coterminous with the boundary of the five borough council wards of Fleetwood and the town council has thirteen councillors.

In the 2010 general election, Fleetwood was joined with Lancaster and some Over Wyre locations to form the new Lancaster and Fleetwood constituency. Conservative member Eric Ollerenshaw was elected in a tight race. From 1997 to 2010, Fleetwood was included with Thornton and parts of Blackpool, as part of the Blackpool North and Fleetwood parliamentary constituency. During that time the seat was held by Labour's Joan Humble. Prior to 1997, Fleetwood was part of the constituencies of Fylde North and Wyre, whose boundaries more closely matched those of Wyre Borough, and which consistently returned a Conservative member. In the 2015 general election a majority vote saw Fleetwood become a Labour town once again, represented by Cat Smith.

== Geography ==
=== Topography ===
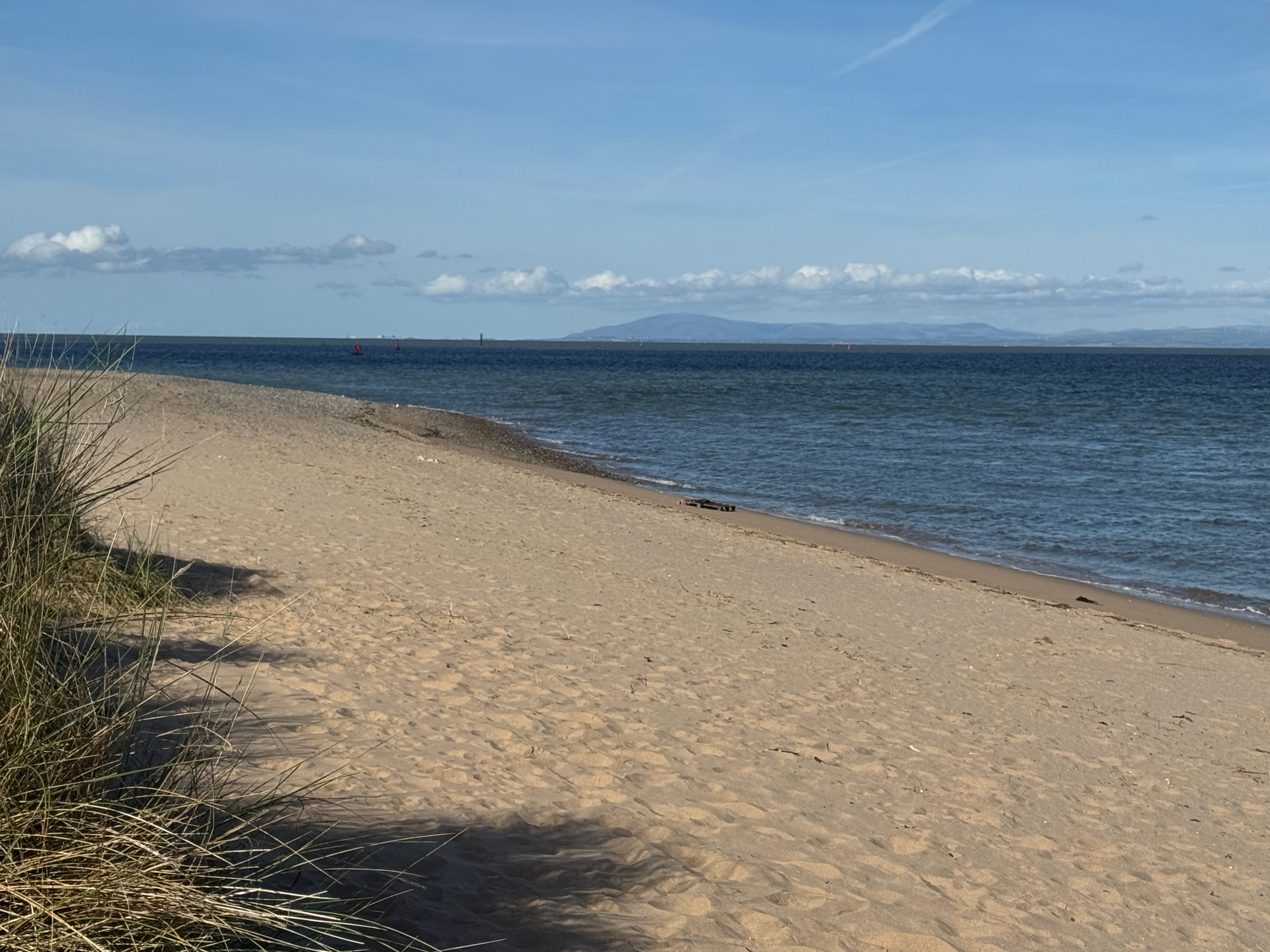
Looking north to the Lake District from Fleetwood Beach

Fleetwood is in the northwest corner of the Fylde coastal plain, 8 miles (13 km) north of Blackpool, on the western side of the mouth of the River Wyre. The town is on a peninsula, almost 2 miles (3 km) wide, bounded to the west by the Irish Sea, to the north by Morecambe Bay and to the east by the River Wyre estuary. Access to Fleetwood is thus restricted, and for many years there were only two roads into and out of the town (three since 1979). A large sandbank, the North Wharf, extends some 2 1/4 miles (3.6 km) north into Morecambe Bay, and is exposed at low tide. The river channel forms the eastern boundary of the bank. Together with the larger Bernard Wharf on the other side of the river, this makes navigation of the river difficult. Conversely, the port is highly sheltered from the prevailing westerly winds.

Like the remainder of the Fylde, the land is extremely flat, the highest point being the Mount, the large sand dune in the northern part of the town, from which the original street plan radiated. Parts of Fleetwood, especially to the north and west, are barely above sea level at high tide, and a large retaining sea wall runs along much of the western edge of the town. Nevertheless, Fleetwood was flooded in 1927 and again in 1977. The latter flood, although much smaller, affected more properties as there had been considerable development in the 1960s in the lower-lying parts of the town. The soil is broadly sandy, but there is considerable marshland to the south and east, by the river. The town itself encompasses an area of just under 4 square miles (10 km^{2}).

=== Climate ===
In common with the rest of the coastal areas of the UK, Fleetwood has a maritime climate. Prevailing winds and weather patterns are northwesterly, leading to a slightly higher average precipitation than the country as a whole, although the absence of high ground in the immediate vicinity moderates this. As with most coastal areas, frost and snow are uncommon. Temperatures are close to the national average.

Climate data for Fleetwood, England, United Kingdom
Month	Jan	Feb	Mar	Apr	May	Jun	Jul	Aug	Sep	Oct	Nov	Dec	Year
Mean daily maximum °C (°F)	6.8 (44.2)	7.1 (44.8)	9.1 (48.4)	11.6 (52.9)	15.2 (59.4)	17.3 (63.1)	19.4 (66.9)	19.4 (66.9)	17 (63)	13.7 (56.7)	9.8 (49.6)	7.6 (45.7)	12.9 (55.2)
Mean daily minimum °C (°F)	1.7 (35.1)	1.6 (34.9)	3.1 (37.6)	4.2 (39.6)	6.9 (44.4)	10 (50)	12.4 (54.3)	12.3 (54.1)	10.2 (50.4)	7.3 (45.1)	4.3 (39.7)	2.5 (36.5)	6.4 (43.5)
Average precipitation mm (inches)	81.1 (3.19)	58.7 (2.31)	68.3 (2.69)	48.9 (1.93)	49 (1.9)	59.8 (2.35)	59.5 (2.34)	73.4 (2.89)	82.5 (3.25)	97.9 (3.85)	94 (3.7)	98.3 (3.87)	871.3 (34.30)
Source: UK Met. Office

== Demography ==
At the 2011 Census, Fleetwood had a population of 25,939. This is a decline of 3.3% over the previous census figure (2001) of 26,840. The 2001 population registered a further decline of about 6% from the 1971 figures, at a time when the overall population of the Borough of Wyre rose by 11%.

At the 2001 census, Wyre Borough is 98.8% White in ethnic makeup. The remainder is split between South Asian (0.4%), Mixed race (0.4%) Black (0.1%) and Other (0.3%).

In June 2020 a meeting in support of the Black Lives Matter movement was planned. However, after an online backlash from Wyre Alliance councillors and locals the gathering was cancelled.

== Economy ==
Fleetwood's economy still revolves around the traditional areas of fishing, tourism, port activity and light industry, but since the early 1970s the town has continued to struggle economically. A government report in 2006 stated that three of the town's five wards fall into the 5% to 10% most deprived wards in England.

The same government report noted that the demise of the fishing industry cost Fleetwood some 8,000 jobs, employment in fishing-related industries falling from 9,000 to less than 1,000, mostly in the fish-processing sector. The closure of the ICI Hillhouse works cost the region a further 4,500 jobs. Industrial and commercial development has been at a standstill for fifteen years and only a single commercial employer based in the town has more than 200 employees. The stock of both commercial and residential property is in decline.

While Wyre Borough in general has a lower unemployment rate than the rest of the United Kingdom, Fleetwood's is considerably higher. Using figures indicating benefit claimants as a percentage of total population (usually considered to be about half the 'actual' unemployment rate) the figures for August 2007 are:

	Male	Female	Total
United Kingdom	3.2%	1.4%	2.3%
Lancashire	2.6%	1.0%	1.8%
Wyre	1.8%	0.8%	1.3%
Fleetwood	3.9%	1.4%	2.7%

Average household income in August 2007 was as follows:

	Average household income in £
United Kingdom	33,700
Lancashire	31,200
Wyre	30,900
Fleetwood	27,350

The town's largest and most prominent single employer is Lofthouse's of Fleetwood Ltd., manufacturers of Fisherman's Friend—a menthol lozenge popular worldwide and especially in Japan.

In July 2007, a new "Masterplan" for revitalizing the town around a "vibrant waterfront and a revitalised town centre" was submitted to the Wyre Borough Council. Some of the funding would come from an EU cash grant. The Masterplan was funded by Wyre Council, the Northwest Development Agency and English Heritage. The plan has three main areas for development:

- Transport: Improvements to the A585 link road. Restoration of the railway link including a new railway station in Fleetwood. Improved links to the riverside coastal paths and Fleetwood Marsh Nature Reserve.
- "Seafront scene transformation": new waterfront environment with housing, beach sports, family area and bigger entertainment attractions. The original plan placed housing on land opposite the Mount on land currently used as a nine-hole pitch and putt course, but, after opposition from residents, this part of the plan was dropped. The waterfront would have a discovery and entertainment centre focused around a re-fashioned Marine Hall, with better health and fitness facilities nearby.
- "Attractive new look for centre": the Masterplan includes plans for more open spaces and more national name shops on Lord Street, with Albert Square and Station Road earmarked as public squares. A new landmark square and heart of the town is proposed on both Lord Street and London Street with cafes, bars and restaurants.

== Culture ==
=== Tourism and amenities ===
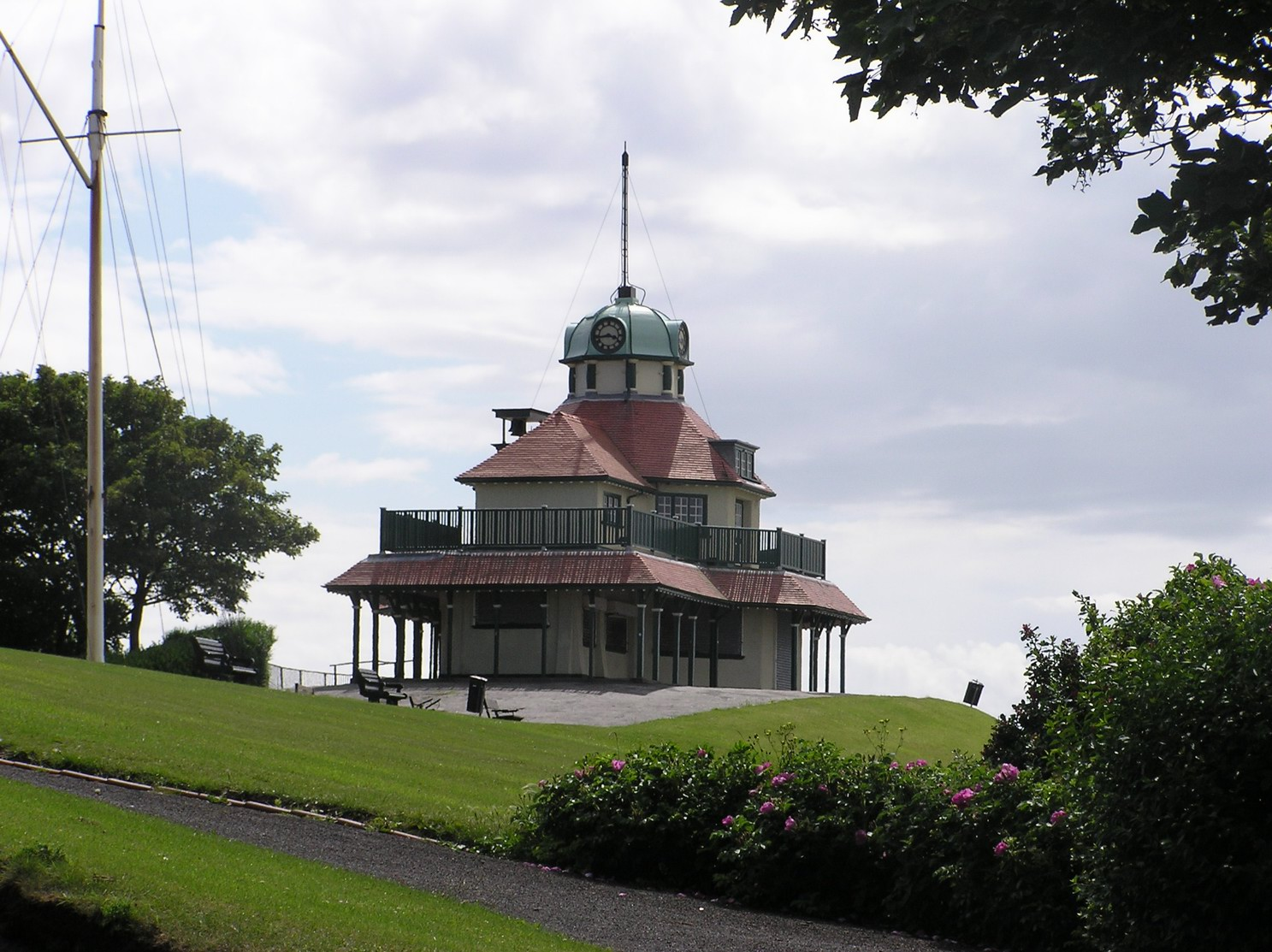
Mount Pavilion (1904) is the highest point in the town.

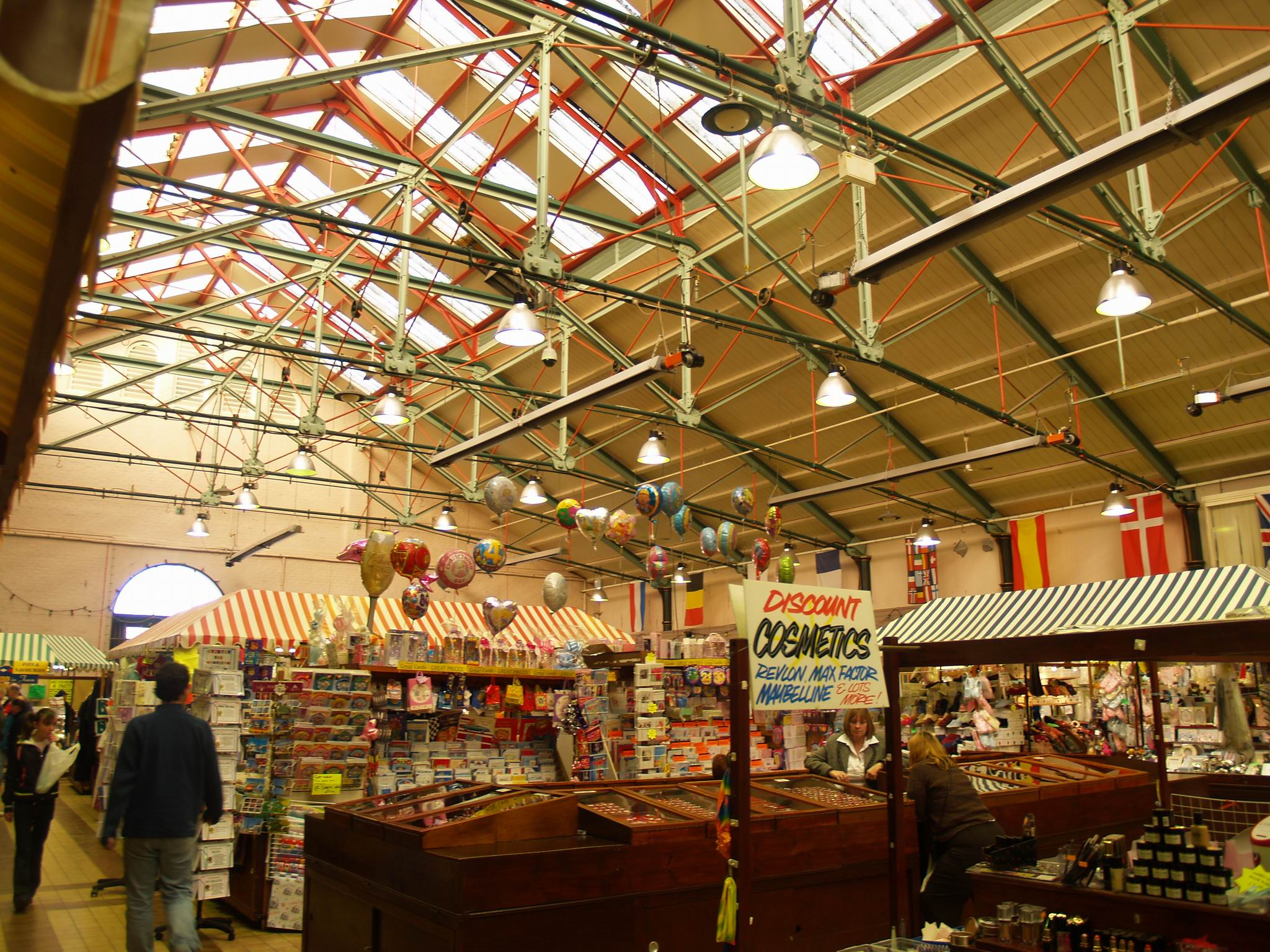
Fleetwood Market has been in operation since 1840.

The town's most prominent feature is the Mount, a 7-acre (2.8 ha) park facing the sea-front, laid out by Decimus Burton, and built on a large sand dune originally known as Tup's Hill. It is surmounted by a pavilion built in 1904 incorporating a clock added in 1919.

The 13 hectares of Fleetwood Memorial Park was developed out of the earlier Warrenhurst Park, itself an early-C20 park designed by Thomas Lumb of Blackpool. In 1917 the park was renamed "Memorial Park" in memory of those who died in the First World War. The memorial statue was added a few years later and memorial trees planted by the children who lost relatives.

In the early 1900s the park was home to a boating lake and the current facilities include three crown green bowling greens, a children's play area and picnic area, cenotaph memorial, duck pond, football pitches (on the site of the old boating lake) and tennis courts.

Fleetwood Pier, also known as 'Victoria Pier', was a feature of the town from its construction in 1910 until it was destroyed by fire in September 2008. Built at the end of the 'golden age' of pier building, it was the last pleasure pier to be built in the United Kingdom, other than a 1957 pier built in Deal, Kent, to replace a structure damaged in the Second World War. At 164 yards (150 m) in length, it was one of the shortest piers in the country. At various times, it was an amusement complex, bar and dance hall. In 1952 the pier was badly damaged in a fire which started in the cinema, and it did not reopen until 1958. The pier was closed again in 2006, and plans were drawn up to convert the structure into a flats complex. However, the pier was again heavily damaged by fire in the early hours of 9 September 2008. On 26 September 2008, Wyre Borough Council announced that the pier would be completely demolished, and two weeks later confirmed that the pier would not be rebuilt. The pier site remains undeveloped many years later, as plans for flats or apartments have come to nothing. The site remains an eyesore and remains fenced off, many years after the fire.

Fleetwood has two prominent retail locations. Affinity Lancashire (formally Freeport Fleetwood) opened in 1995. It is a waterfront outlet shopping village, on the site of the former Wyre Dock, with 45 shops in a marina setting. Freeport was re-branded and re-launched in 2006 at a cost of £8.6m. Fleetwood Market on Victoria Street is one of the largest covered markets in the North West, with over 250 stalls. It was first opened in 1840, although the present stone building dates from 1892.

=== Museums ===
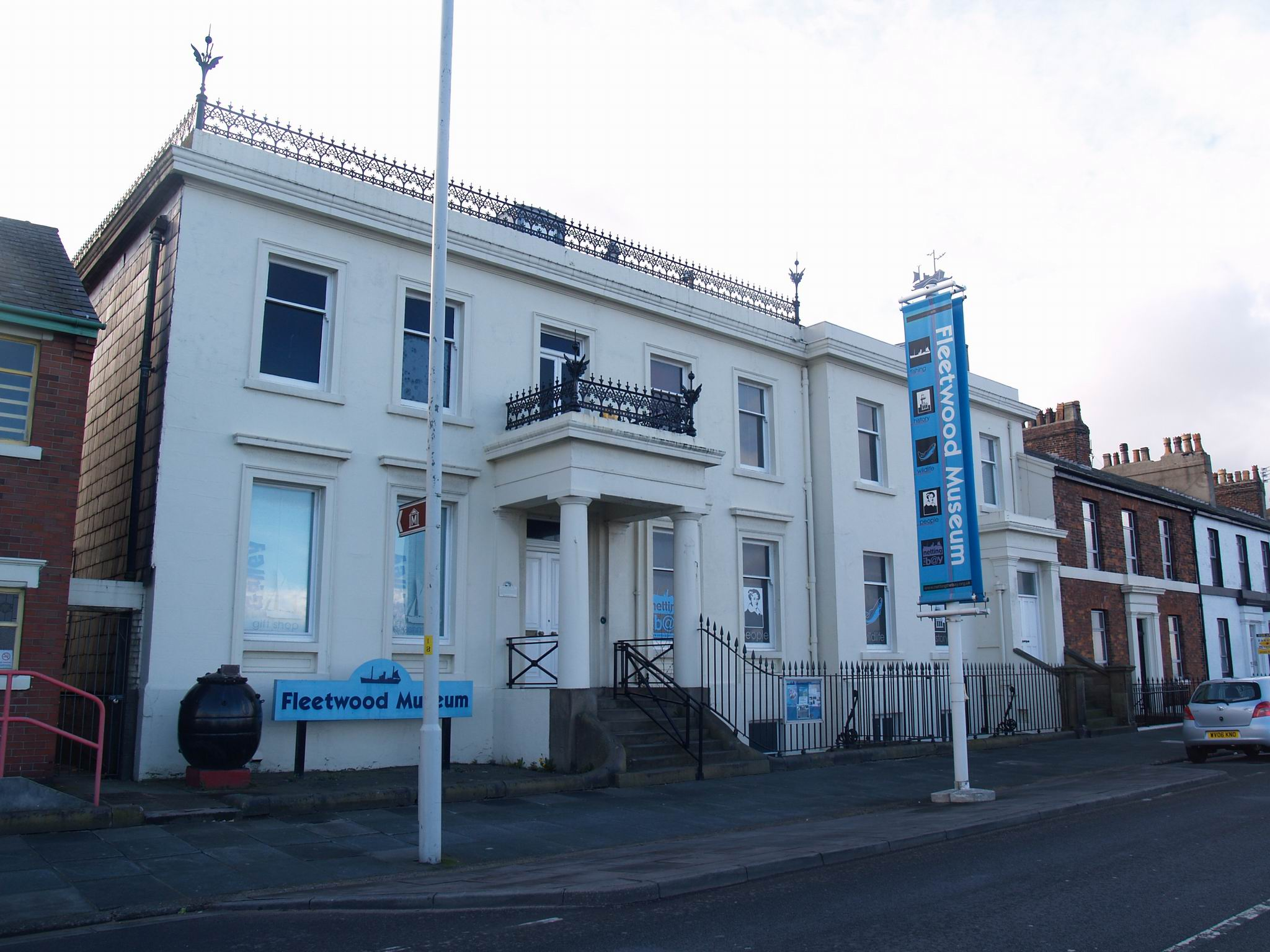
Fleetwood Museum, formerly the town hall and before that the Customs House (1836), the oldest building in the town

Fleetwood Museum stands on Queen's Terrace. The building, designed by Decimus Burton, was completed in 1836 and is the oldest surviving building in Fleetwood. It was originally the Customs House, and from 1889 to 1974 it served as Fleetwood Town Hall, until local government activity was moved to Poulton. It was designated as the town's museum in 1992. The museum tells the story of the fishing industry in the town. In January 2006, the museum was threatened with closure by owners Lancashire County Council (LCC). However, volunteers helped re-launch the museum in April 2007, setting up the Fleetwood Museum Trust to run the museum in partnership with LCC for twelve months with the intention of the trust eventually running the museum themselves. The museum also operates the Jacinta, the town's "heritage trawler", stationed in the Wyre Dock Marina and open for public viewing throughout the year. Built in 1972, it was moved to Hull in 1982, before being handed over to the Jacinta Charitable Trust in 1995 when restoration work began on the trawler. Unfortunately the Jacinta had deteriorated too much for economical repair and was cut up for scrap over the period of June to August 2019.

=== Churches ===
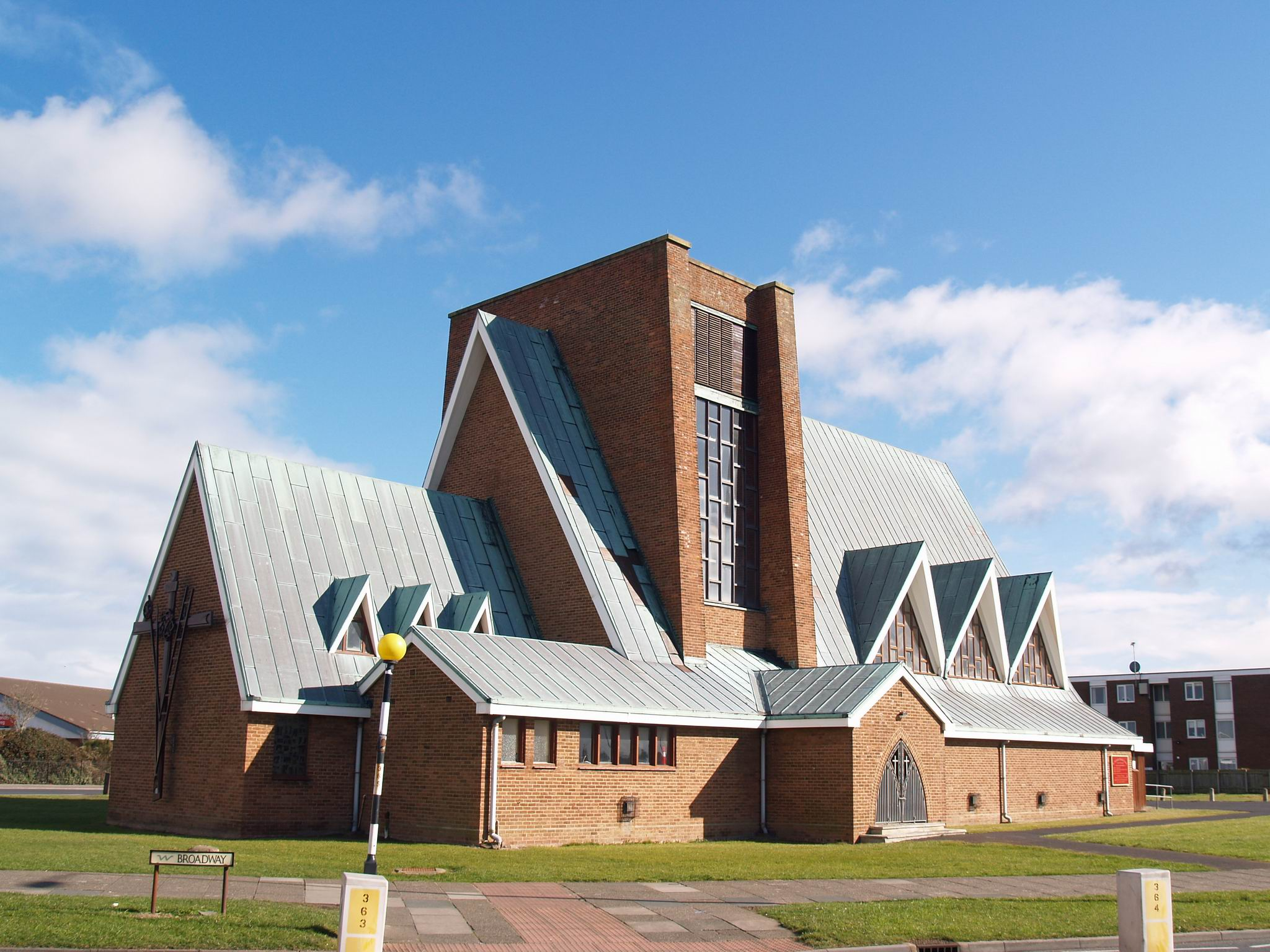
St Nicholas' Church (1962), designed by Laurence King

Fleetwood's parish church, St Peter's, designed by Decimus Burton in 1841, stands at the corner of Lord Street and North Albert Street. It formerly had a spire, but this was demolished in 1904. St Mary's, the town's main Roman Catholic church, stands nearby. Built in 1867, it was designed by E. W. Pugin. A more modern church of interest is the copper-roofed St Nicholas, on Poulton Road, designed by Laurence King and completed in 1962.

=== Other buildings ===
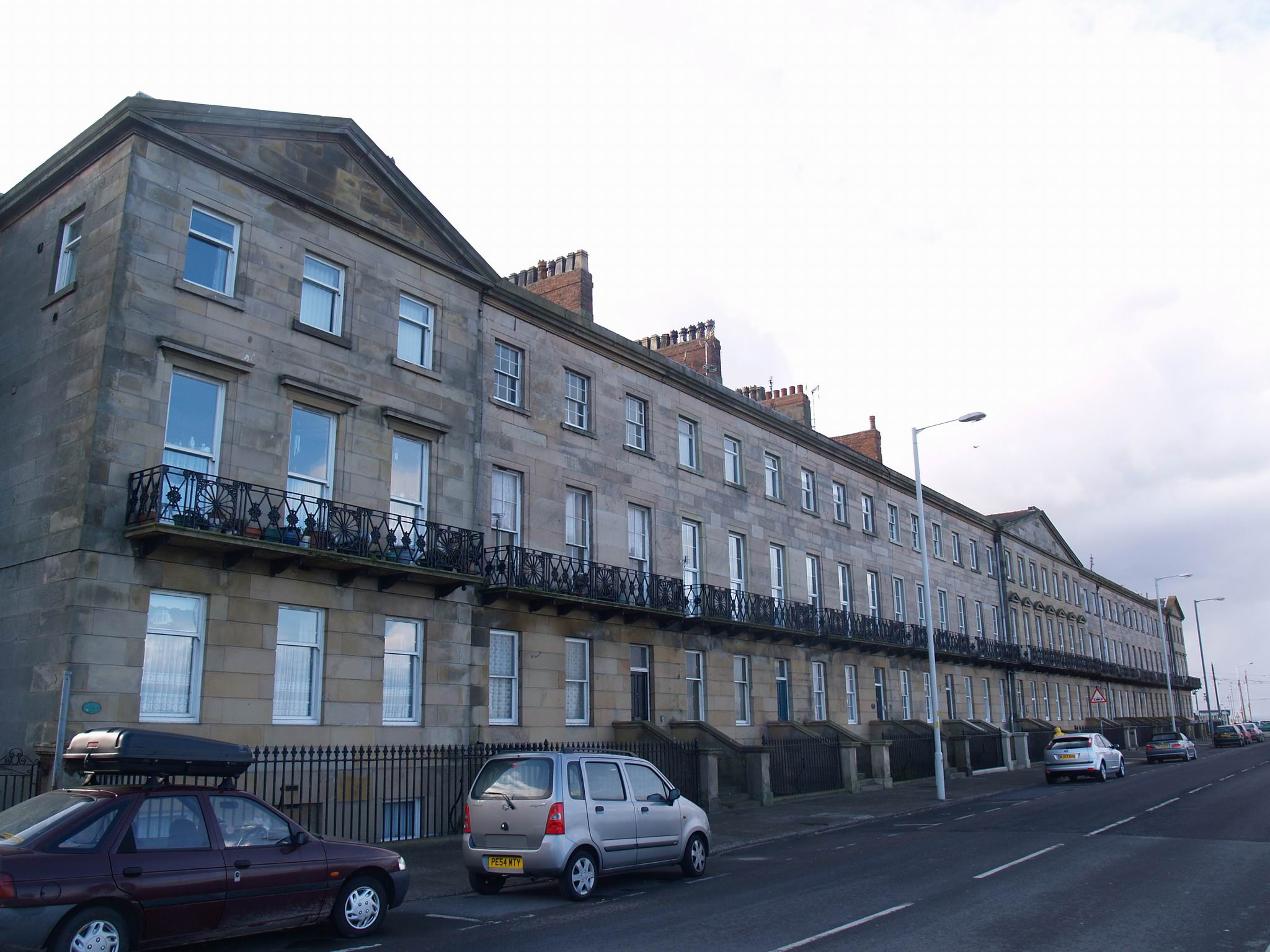
Queen's Terrace (1844), designed by Decimus Burton

Numerous other buildings designed by Decimus Burton remain in the town. Prominent are the Pharos and Lower Lighthouses, opened in 1840 and still in operation. Ships sailing down the Wyre channel line up the two lights, one above the other, to guide them. The Pharos is the only functioning lighthouse in the United Kingdom built in the middle of the street. It now forms a traffic roundabout. The North Euston Hotel, opened in 1841, is still the largest hotel in Fleetwood. Queen's Terrace was completed in 1844 and is regarded as an outstanding example of classical architecture. Now mostly used for offices and private flats, at various times it has been used as a school, hospital, railway offices and wartime consulates for European nations. The town contains a total of forty-four buildings listed in the National Heritage List for England, all at Grade II.

=== Media ===
Fleetwood Weekly News covers the town and the North Fylde Area. The newspaper was founded in 1984 as a successor to the Fleetwood Chronicle, which had ceased publication several weeks earlier. The Chronicle itself, founded in 1843, was the oldest newspaper in the Fylde. Daily newspaper coverage is provided by the Blackpool Gazette. Both papers are published by Johnston Press, as is the Lancashire Evening Post, a daily newspaper covering the county of Lancashire.

Fleetwood falls within the coverage area of BBC Radio Lancashire. Commercial radio stations serving the area include Greatest Hits Radio, Hits Radio Lancashire and Greatest Hits Lancashire based in Preston and Smooth North West and Heart North West broadcasting from Greater Manchester.

Independent television service is provided by ITV Granada, the ITV franchise holder for the North West region. BBC North West is the regional BBC station serving Fleetwood.

=== Festivals ===
Fylde Folk Festival is held each year at the Marine Hall and other venues in the town. It is a festival of traditional and contemporary folk music, song and dance. The festival has been held continuously since 1971. The opening concert was staged each year onboard Jacinta, the town's heritage trawler; however due to the vessel's generally poor state of repair, this is no longer the case.

Another annual music festival, originating in 2005, is Fleetwoodstock, named after the famous New York Woodstock Festival and held in the autumn. The usual venue is the Marine Hall.

The now annual Yuto Fest, which was first held in 2011, also takes place at the Marine Hall. Yuto Fest is a charity festival featuring local bands that was set up by Daz Rice of Kiss of the Gypsy and is a legacy for his three-year-old son Yuto Rice who died in 2012 after battling a heart condition.

Fleetwood Transport Festival, also known as Tram Sunday, has been held annually on the third Sunday of July since 1985. It is a festival of vintage vehicles highlighted by a number of historical tram-cars, which parade along Lord Street.

Fleetwood Beer & Cider Festival is held in February each year and is organised by the Blackpool, Fylde and Wyre branch of CAMRA. The festival offers a choice of around 100 real ales as well as a selection of ciders and foreign beers.

=== Music ===
The young John Lennon spent his childhood summer holidays in Fleetwood with a cousin who lived in the town, returning to the town on 25 August 1962 when the Beatles played at the Marine Hall. Operatic tenor Alfie Boe grew up in Fleetwood and his first public performance was at the Marine Hall at the age of 14, where he worked as a stage technician. Operatic mezzo-soprano Jean Rigby was also born in Fleetwood.

The best-known rock bands to feature musicians from Fleetwood are television talking head John Robb's the Membranes and Goldblade, punk band One Way System (the first signing on Cherry Red's Anagram Records), Uncle Fester/UFX, Earthling Society, who have released six critically acclaimed albums, and Kiss of the Gypsy, who were signed to Atlantic Records in the US. One Way System drummer Tommy Couch (brother of boxer Jane Couch) played drums with UK Subs for two years. and has been voted one of the top 30 best punk drummers of all time.

Musicians from One Way System, UFX and Kiss of the Gypsy combined in 2011 to release a gothic psychobilly album as Boneyard Zombies and in 2014 the debut release by rock and roll garage band The Crawlin' Hex, formed by members of Earthling Society and UFX received a series of positive reviews.

Another influential Fleetwood musician is folk singer Alan Bell, the founder and director of the internationally renowned Fylde Folk Festival which ran for 42 years until Bell's retirement in 2014. Bell's suite The Band in the Park won the prestigious Radio Italia prize for Broadcasting for BBC Radio Lancashire and resulted in a BBC2 Television programme devoted to Bell – Alan Bell: The Man and His Music. The festival is to be superseded in 2015 by the New Folk 'n' Roots Festival. Stuart Chatwood of Canadian rock band the Tea Party was also born in Fleetwood.

=== Sport ===
Fleetwood has had several football clubs over its history. The current version of the club, dating from 1997, is now known as Fleetwood Town F.C. and is nicknamed the Fishermen, and its followers the Cod Army. The club has played in the Football League since 2012, having been promoted in that year as champions of the Conference National. This is the first time a club from the town has played in the Football League. In May 2014 Fleetwood were victorious in the League 2 play-off final to win promotion to League 1. In round 4 of the 2026-27 EFL Cup, the Fishermen defeated Arsenal in a penalty shootout to secure their first quarter-final appearance. In August 2014, Nathan Pond played in his seventh different division for the club, an achievement officially recognised by Guinness as a world record under the title of 'the most football (soccer) divisions played in for one club by an individual.' . With a population of under 26,000, Fleetwood was the smallest town in England with a League club until the promotion of Forest Green Rovers from Nailsworth in 2017.

A previous incarnation of Fleetwood Town F.C. enjoyed a brief history from 1977, reaching the final of the FA Vase in 1985, before being wound up because of financial difficulties in 1996. The same fate also befell the two previous town clubs. Fleetwood F.C. was founded in 1908 and wound up in 1976, having been several times Lancashire Combination cup champions in the 1930s, and founder members of the Northern Premier League in 1968. Fleetwood Rangers, the town's first club, spent ten seasons in the Lancashire League and Lancashire Combination from 1889 to 1899. Since 1939, home games have been played at Highbury Stadium. Blackpool Reserves also use the stadium for their home matches.

In January 1938, Jimmy Hampson, who remains Blackpool's record goalscorer, drowned off the Fleetwood coast during a fishing trip. The yacht on which he was sailing collided with a trawler and Hampson, 31, was knocked overboard. He drowned, and his body was never recovered.

Speedway racing was staged at Highbury Stadium from 1948 to 1952, with Fleetwood Flyers riding in the Second Division of the National Speedway league. The Flyers started the 1948 season as Wigan RLFC but moved to Fleetwood after racing a few away fixtures billed as Wigan. The Flyers raced in the National League Division Two from 1948 to 1951 without enjoying any great success. In 1952 the venue staged a number of open events with the team renamed the Fleetwood Knights.

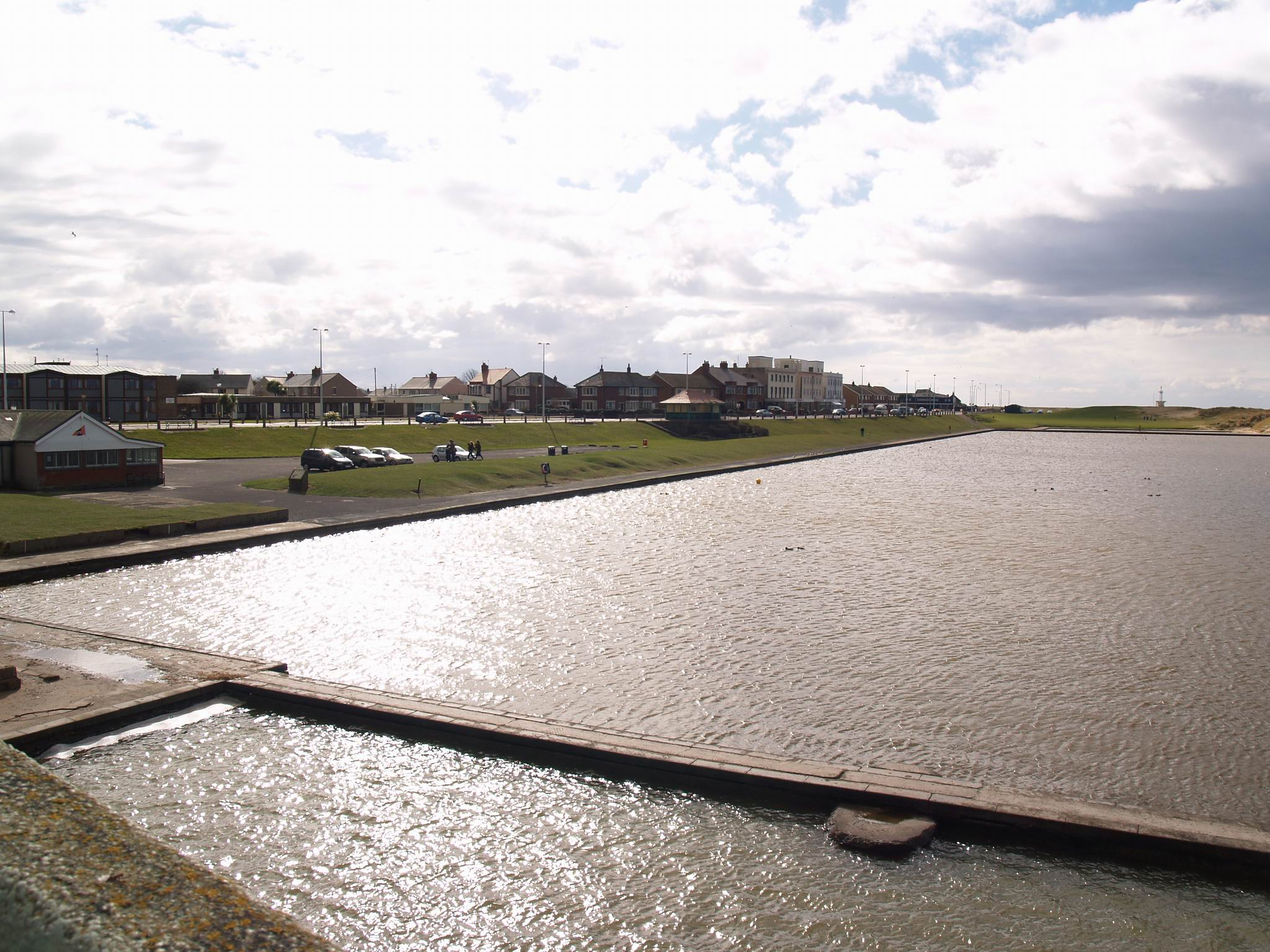
Model Yacht Pond, one of Europe's largest, built in 1932

Fleetwood Rugby Union Football Club is an amateur rugby union club, first registered in 1932 as Fleetwood Old Boys, with the Old Boys title being dropped in the 1950s. Fleetwood Cricket Club, based at Broadwater, are affiliated with the Lancashire Cricket Board and compete in the Northern League.

From the 1930s to the present, the Model Yacht Pond, one of Europe's largest, has been host to numerous national and international championships, held under the aegis of the Fleetwood Model Yacht and Power Boat Club.

Fleetwood Reservoir on Copse Road provides coarse fishing facilities. The fishing club is affiliated to the National Federation of Anglers. Matches take place every Sunday and Friday during the summer.

Fleetwood is a popular location for kitesurfing and other power kite sports. There are several suitable beaches and training is available at the local kite school.

== Health ==
Fleetwood has suffered severe unemployment due to the collapse of the fishing industry and the closure of a local ICI factory. Unemployment adversely affected health and life expectancy in the town. There has been a local initiative, Healthier Fleetwood, based on social prescribing, to encourage residents to take control of their lives and take action to live healthier lives. This initiative had some degree of success. The number of Fleetwood residents at Blackpool's A&E has dropped by 11.5% in a year. There are suggestions it should be copied in other areas with similar problems.

== Transport ==
Site of former railway station
Tramway

Fleetwood lies at the northern end of the Blackpool tramway, which is operated by Blackpool Transport. It is about 12 miles (19 km) from Fleetwood to the southern terminus at Starr Gate, and about 8 miles (13 km) to Talbot Square, Blackpool. There are ten tram stops in the town, the southernmost being Rossall School. Trams run the full length of both Lord Street and North Albert Street, undivided from regular road traffic. Bus service to Blackpool is provided by Blackpool Transport and the town's ownArchway Travel, who also provide services to Preston and other local destinations.

There are frequent passenger ferry sailings from Fleetwood across the River Wyre to Knott End-on-Sea via the Wyre Estuary Ferry.

Passenger sailings to Douglas are not currently on a regular timetable. Ferries were operated by the Isle of Man Steam Packet Company from 1876 to 1961, and again periodically from 1971. However, in recent years the service has been restricted to once or twice per year. From 2004, Stena Line provided some passenger accommodation on its thrice daily service to Larne in Northern Ireland. However, Stena Line withdrew the service at the end of 2010.

The town being built on a peninsula, for many years there were only two roads into and out of Fleetwood: Broadway, through Cleveleys, designated as the A587, and Fleetwood Road, through Thornton, designated as the A585. To cater for container traffic, Amounderness Way was built in the late 1970s and re-designated as the A585. In the 1990s, Amounderness Way was extended further into the town to the end of Dock Street (the entrance to the Freeport shopping village) along the former railway bed.

The town was for several years the northern Fylde terminus of the railway line to London, hence the hotel opposite the site of the now demolished Fleetwood railway station is called the North Euston Hotel. The line also carried landed fish from the docks to distant markets. There has been no railway service to Fleetwood since 1970. Poulton-le-Fylde and Blackpool North are the nearest railway stations. However, the line to Poulton is still present, and plans remain to re-open the line in the future. In June 2021 a feasibility study was submitted by the Lancashire County Council to the Department for Transport to re-open the line from Fleetwood to Poulton-le-Fylde, under the government's Restoring Your Railway programme.

== Education ==
Rossall School is a co-educational, independent, day and boarding school for ages 5 to 18. It was founded in 1844 on the site of Rossall Hall in the south west of the town. There are two public-sector secondary schools in the town. Fleetwood High School on Broadway was founded in 1977 as a comprehensive non-denominational secondary school, a successor to Fleetwood Grammar School (1921–77) and Bailey School. It was 're-branded' as Fleetwood Sports College in 2005 when the school was given specialist school status in sport, but reverted to its original name in September 2010. Cardinal Allen Catholic High School is a Roman Catholic high school, founded in 1963 as a secondary modern school.

The only tertiary educational institution in Fleetwood is the Nautical Campus of Blackpool and The Fylde College, located at Broadwater.

Fleetwood has seven public sector primary schools. Chaucer Community Primary School serves the oldest part of the town, around the Mount. Shakespeare Primary School serves the northwest part of the town. Flakefleet Primary School serves the south-central Flakefleet area. Charles Saer Primary School and Larkholme Primary School serve the western part of the town, around West View and Larkholme. Additionally, there are two Roman Catholic primary schools: St Mary's, founded in 1870, which serves the northern part of the town, and St Wulstan's and St Edmund's, serving the southern part of the town and formed in 2006 from a merger of two existing schools.

The town is also home to a large public library, which as well as lending print and audio-visual material also has an extensive reference and local studies collection.

== Notable people ==
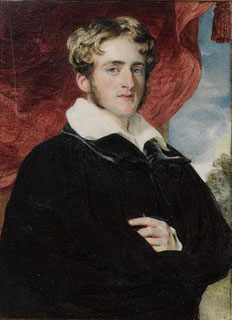
Peter Hesketh-Fleetwood, 1826

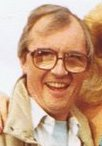
Syd Little, 1980s

- William Allen (1532–1594), English Catholic priest and cardinal
- Lorraine Beavers (born 1962), politician, MP for Blackpool North and Fleetwood since 2024
- Alfie Boe (born 1973), actor, singer and operatic tenor who performs primarily in the musical theatre
- Decimus Burton (1800–1881), architect and landscaper, friend of Peter Hesketh who designed Fleetwood
- Stuart Chatwood (born 1969), bass player in The Tea Party and videogame soundtrack composer
- Kelsey-Beth Crossley (born 1992), actress, played Scarlett Nicholls in Emmerdale.
- Dan Forshaw (born 1981), jazz musician, plays the saxophone, grew up and worked locally.
- Julia Grant (1954–2019), transgender activist, grew up locally as George Roberts; later star of BBC documentary A Change of Sex.
- Sir Peter Hesketh-Fleetwood, 1st Baronet (1801–1866), landowner, developer who founded Fleetwood; appointed High Sheriff of Lancashire in 1830; MP for Preston 1832–1847
- Syd Little (born 1942), one of the comedy duo Little and Large along with Eddie Large, runs a local pub.
- Susan Littler (1947–1982), an English actress who appeared in many TV and stage productions
- Percy C. Mather (1882–1933), pioneer English Protestant Christian missionary to China, the second China Inland Mission missionary to Xinjiang Province
- Rachel de Montmorency (1891–1961), an English painter and artist who worked in stained glass
- George Mulock (1882–1963), an Anglo-Irish Royal Navy officer, cartographer and polar explorer
- Charles Kay Ogden (1889–1957), linguist, philosopher and writer; invented and propagated the idea of Basic English.
- Jean Rigby (born 1961), mezzo-soprano opera and concert singer; principal with the English National Opera
- John Robb (born 1961), musician, bassist and singer for The Membranes & Goldblade
- Frank Searle (1921–2005), photo hoaxer of the Loch Ness Monster
- Darrel Treece-Birch (born 1967), progressive rock keyboard player and songwriter, with Melodic Hard Rock band Ten

=== Sport ===
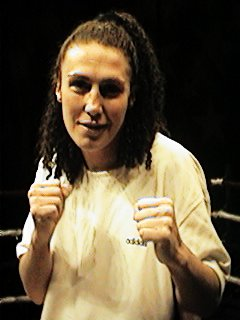
Jane Couch, 1996

- John Adshead (born 1942), former head coach of New Zealand men's national football team – "the All Whites"
- Jane Couch (born 1968), former Women's International Boxing Federation welterweight champion in 1996
- Bob Crewdson (late 19thC - 20thC), footballer, played 209 games for Blackpool
- Wes Newton (born 1977), Professional darts player, born in Blackpool, now resides in Fleetwood
- Tom Pratt, (1873–1935), footballer, played over 200 games, mainly for Preston North End
- Charlie Rattray (1911–1995), footballer who played over 150 games
- Billy Ronson (1957–2015) former footballer, played over 600 games, many indoor games in the USA
- Jack Scott (1875–1931), footballer who played 309 games for Blackpool
- George Smith (1921–2013), former footballer played 186 games for Manchester City and 250 for Chesterfield
- Harry Stirzaker (1869–1948), former footballer played 154 games for Blackpool
- Alan Tinsley (born 1951), footballer who has played over 250 games for Fleetwood Town
- John Whiteside (1861–1946), cricketer active from 1888 to 1906, played in 231 first-class cricket matches

== See also ==
- Listed buildings in Fleetwood
- Fleetwood power stations
- Mac Fisheries
