= The Mount, Fleetwood =

The Mount
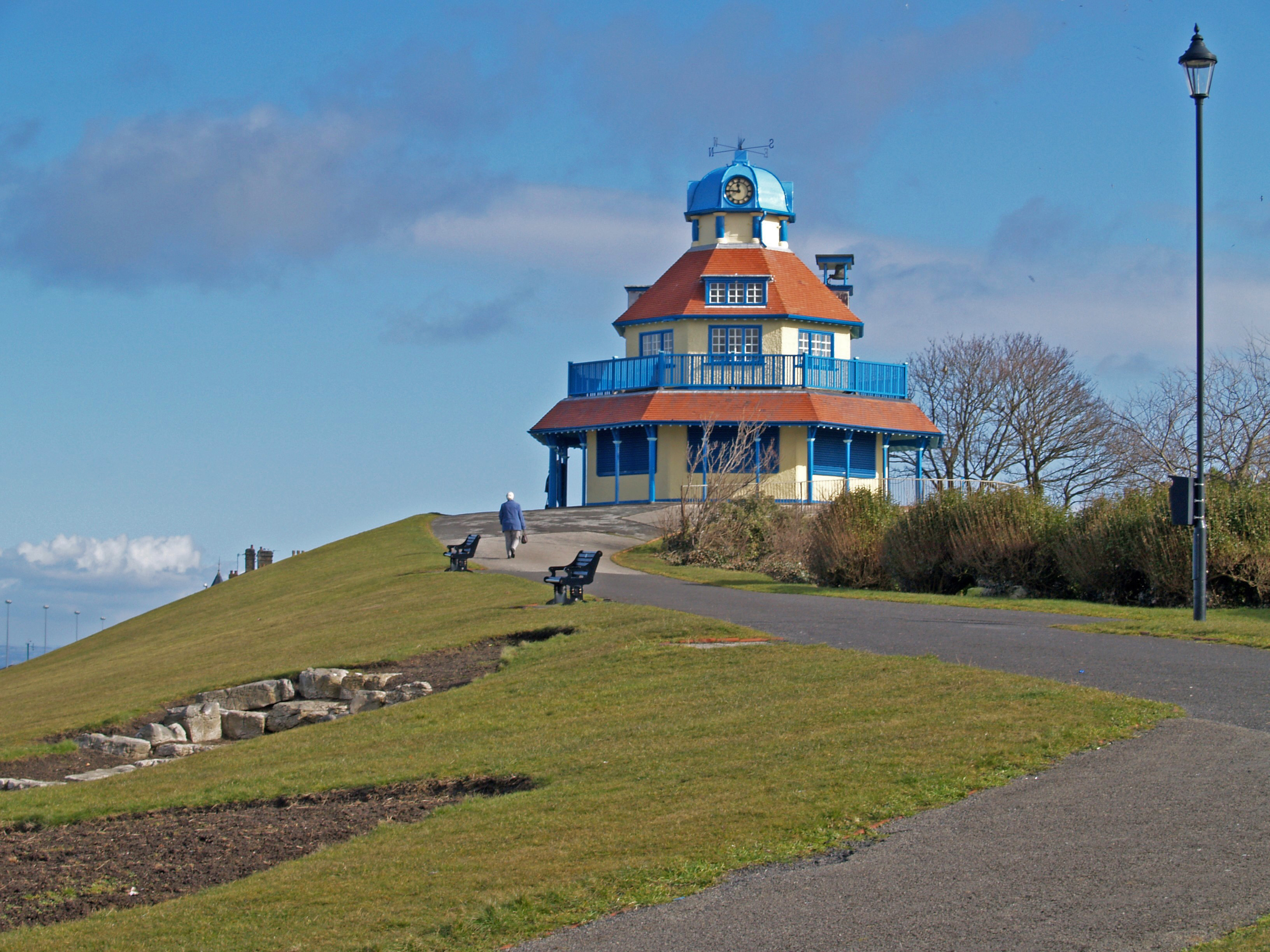
- The building viewed from the west in 2010

- Location within Fleetwood The Mount, Fleetwood (Lancashire) The Mount, Fleetwood (England)

General information
- Location: Fleetwood, Lancashire, England
- Coordinates: 53.9258°N 3.0161°W
- Opening: 1904 (122 years ago)

Design and construction
- Architect: Decimus Burton

Listed Building – Grade II
- Designated: 30 June 1989
- Reference no.: 1072400

The Mount is a pavilion in Fleetwood, Lancashire, England. Built between 1902 and 1904, to a design by Decimus Burton, the structure has been Grade II listed by English Heritage since 1989.

The building, which stands atop a large sand dune originally known as Tup's Hill overlooking the Irish Sea, replaced a pagoda, also designed by Burton, around which he planned the layout of Fleetwood. The pavilion is constructed of roughcast brick with tile roofs. It has an octagonal dome with a copper roof. Part of a 7-acre (2.8 ha) site, it is located between The Esplanade to the north and Mount Road to the south.

The original construction played an important part in allowing 19th-century Fleetwood to operate as a 24-hour port. Its flagstaff was used to send flag signals out to sea, while the building was used as a coastguard lookout. In 1886, the Met Office installed an anemometer on the building to record wind speed and rainfall. Information was dispatched daily to Greenwich via telegraph.

In 1919, a World War I memorial in the form of a clock was installed at the Mount. It contains two bells.

When Fleetwood was hit by a flood in October 1927, putting 90% of the town under water, only the higher areas around the Mount escaped.

The wall on the inland side of the Mount is built from pebbles, in traditional Fylde style. The Mount and the entire length of Fleetwood Promenade has an uninterrupted view across Morecambe Bay, a view described by author Bill Bryson in chapter 23 of his book Notes From a Small Island as "easily one of the most beautiful in the world, with unforgettable views across to the green and blue Lakeland hills: Scafell, Coniston Old Man, the Langdale Pikes." Directly across the Esplanade from the Mount lies the Marine Hall and Marine Gardens, Wyre Borough's largest entertainment venue, opened in 1935.

The upper floors of the building were converted into apartments in 1990.

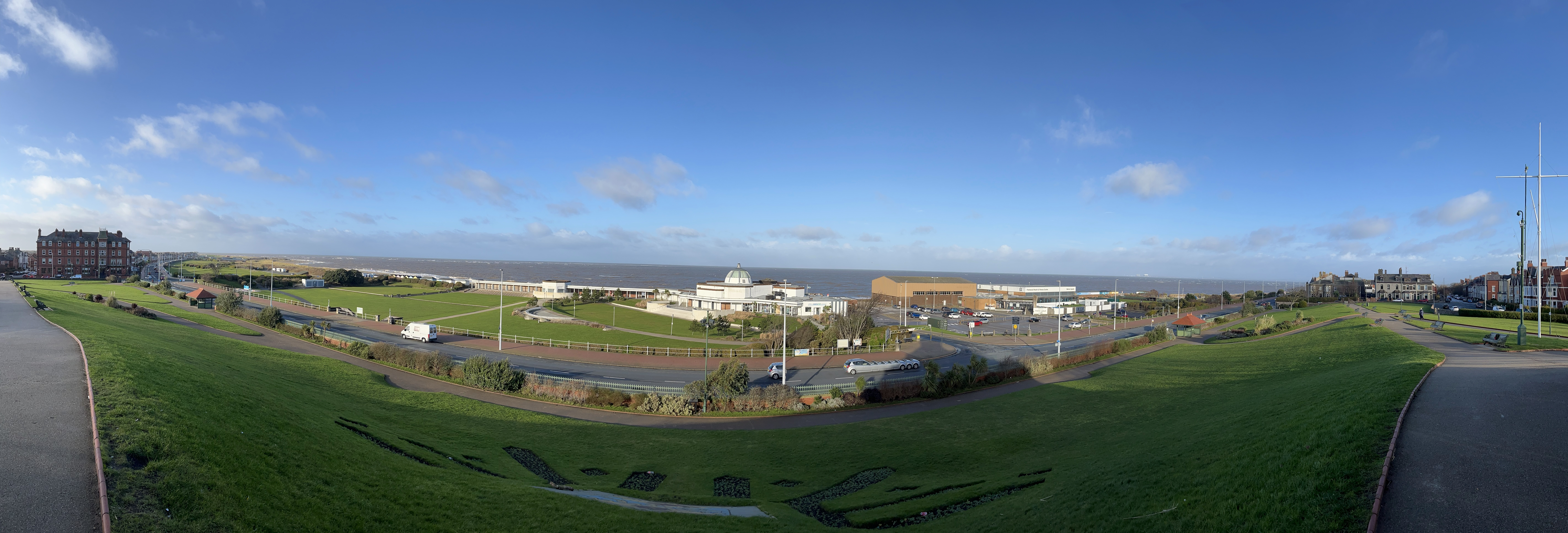
Panoramic northerly view of The Esplanade and the Irish Sea from the Mount. The Mount Hotel is on the left (2023)

An adjacent building to the west is named the Mount Hotel. It is also Grade II listed.

== See also ==
- Listed buildings in Fleetwood
