= Fleetwood Market =

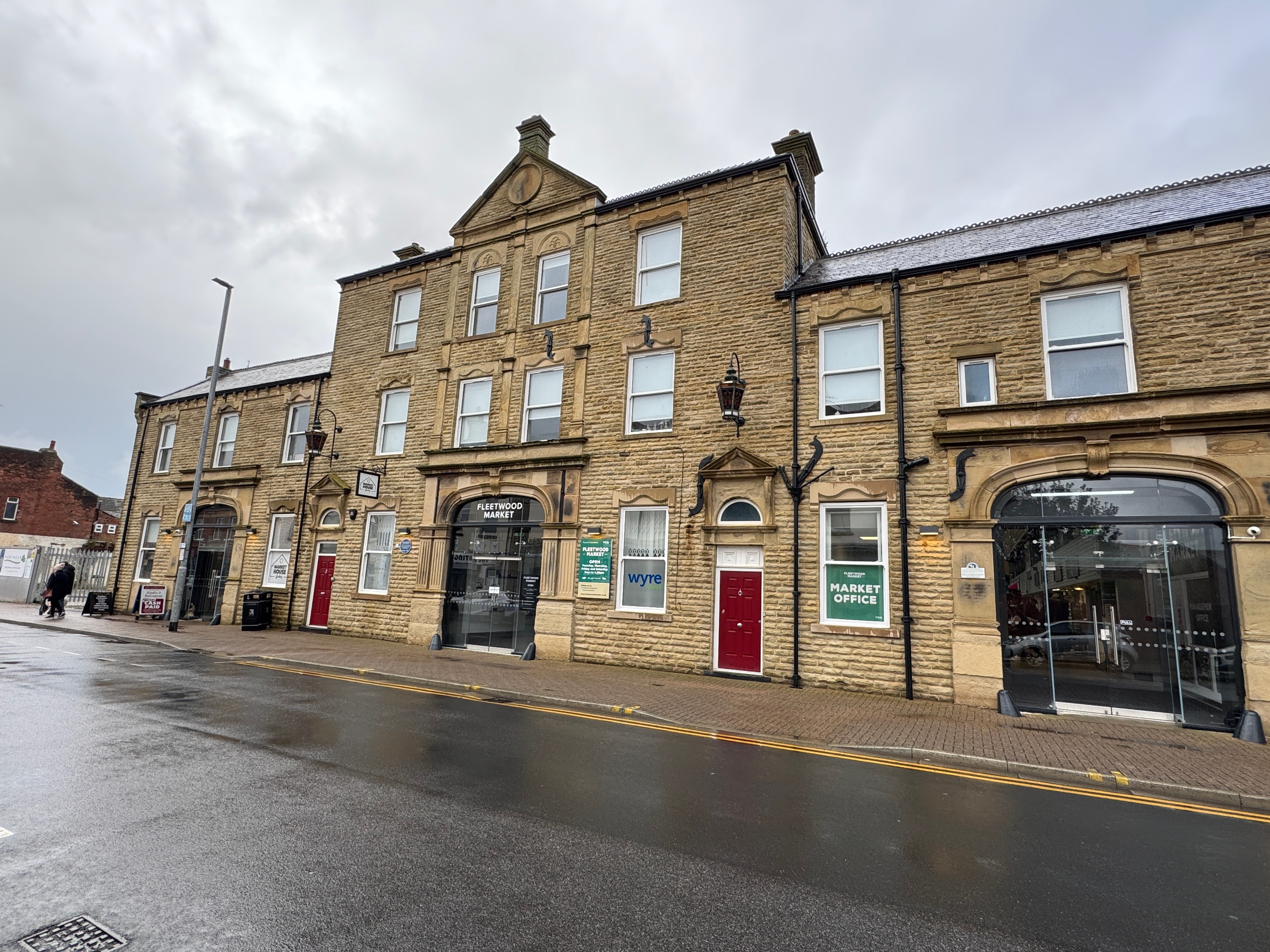
- The market hall's Adelaide Street entrance in 2024
- Location: Fleetwood, Lancashire, England
- Coordinates: 53.9241°N 3.006°W
- Opened: 7 November 1840 (186 years ago)
- Website: fleetwoodmarket.co.uk

Fleetwood Market is a Victorian market hall in Fleetwood, Lancashire, England. Located between Adelaide Street and Victoria Street, it was established in 1840, making it one of the oldest markets in the county.

In 1235, King Henry III granted a market charter to Rossall manor. This included the future site of Fleetwood, but it was not for another 605 years that Sir Peter Hesketh-Fleetwood, then lord of the manor, and his wife, Lady Hesketh, established a market. The original building was constructed of wood with a slate roof. Local purveyors sold farm produce alongside textiles and clothing from traders from Manchester.

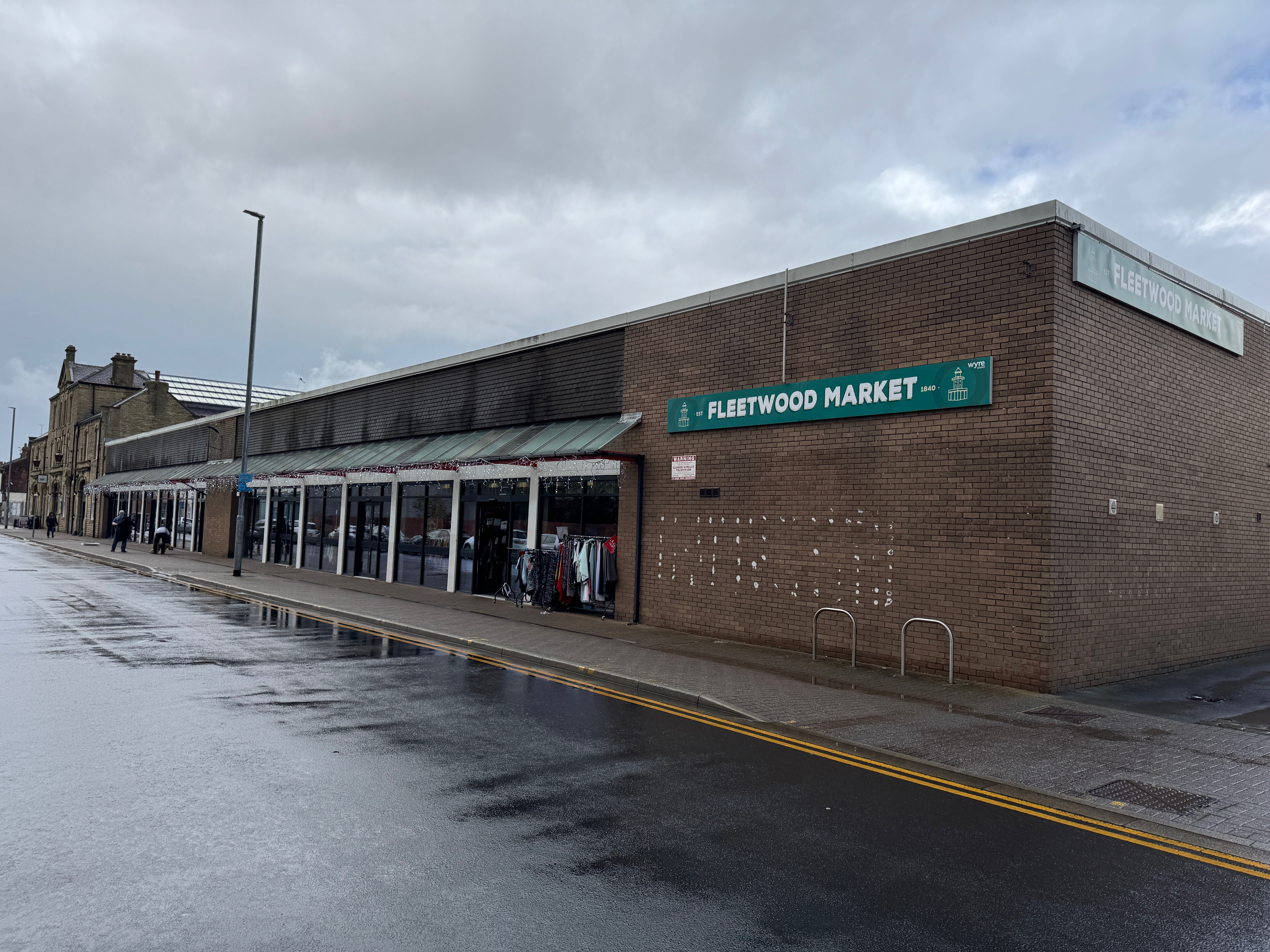
The market's 1990 extension

Cattle and livestock were being sold at the market by 1868. Seven years later, the market was sold to the Fleetwood Estate Company. In 1890, Fleetwood Local Government Board purchased the market, adding an open market. The main hall was rebuilt in 1892.

The market was extended in 1990, and refurbished at a cost of £3.2 million between 2000 and 2024. It was partly funded by the High Streets Heritage Action Zone (HSHAZ) grant sourced from central government via Historic England. Later in 2024, a blue plaque denoting the market's "marvellous heritage" was installed by Fleetwood Civic Society beside one of its Adelaide Street entrances.

A farmers' market is held at the market once a month.
