= Kiss of the Gypsy =

- Origin: Fleetwood, England
- Genres: Rock
- Years active: 1990-1993 (as Kiss of the Gypsy); 2004-2022 (as XGypsy); 2022 to date.
- Labels: Atlantic
- Members: Kiss Of The Gypsy: Chris Clancy; Daz Rice; Martin Talbot; Scott Elliott; George Williams; XGypsy: Tony Mitchell
- Past members: Kiss Of The Gypsy: Tony Mitchell
- Website: http://www.kissofthegypsy.co.uk

Kiss of the Gypsy is an English rock band, formed by Tony Mitchell, Darren Rice, George Williams, Scott Elliott and Martin Talbot in Fleetwood, Lancashire in 1990.

== History ==
In 1991, Fleetwood, Lancashire, England, blues rock band Kiss of the Gypsy, led by singer-songwriter, Tony Mitchell, released their only album, Kiss of the Gypsy. The band lasted three years, released one album and three singles, after being signed to Atlantic Records USA in 1991. When Atlantic UK folded that same year, Kiss of the Gypsy was passed over to East West UK and, in 1992, began work on a new album. The album was never released, and with the lack of record company support, Kiss of the Gypsy disbanded in 1993.

In 1993, Daz Rice opened a music store in Cleveleys, Blackpool, called Dazamakiz. Rice put all of his efforts into the shop and family but continued to write/record and perform. In 2010, he joined as lead guitarist and vocalist with well-known Blackpool and Fylde Coast local band The Blue Pig Orchestra. More recently Rice has a new side project/originals band, Phantom Voices.

In 2004, Mitchell formed the XGypsy music production company with his wife Dawn, intended as a direct continuation of Kiss of the Gypsy and, since then, he has run his own recording studio and written for numerous bands and artists, as well as soundtracks for TV/film and media, specialising in the horror/goth genre.

After director Quentin Tarantino had used the track "Stuck in the Middle" by Stealers Wheel, in the soundtrack of his debut film Reservoir Dogs, there had been renewed interest in Stealers Wheel. Tony Williams re-formed Stealers Wheel and in 2008, Mitchell was brought into the band to write and record songs for a new Stealers Wheel album.

In 2010, Mitchell released his own album, Black Rhapsody, as Kingdom of Dead Men. In 2011, under the pseudonym Syd Zilla, Mitchell joined forces with fellow Fleetwood musicians: Dunk Rock, vocalist with UFX, with whom Mitchell had previously collaborated in Gothic Metal band, Puppet Master, and bassist Andy Wilkinson and drummer Tommy Couch, the rhythm section of the punk rock group One Way System, to form psychobilly band, Boneyard Zombies, to an excited press response. Boneyard Zombies released the limited edition "vinyl" CD album, Death Rattle and Roll, in 2012.

In 2022, Kiss Of The Gypsy released a new EP. "Thirty" featuring new vocalist Chris Clancy of Mutiny Within.

== Reception ==
Kiss of the Gypsy received mixed reviews. Their 1991 debut single, "Whatever It Takes" was Single of the Week on release in Kerrang! magazine and reached number 4 in the UK Rock Chart. The band also played the single live on TV on ITV's James Whale Show, and were featured in Kerrang! on several other occasions (issues 362, 378, 382 and 406 all carried lengthy articles on the band, including a three-page interview in Issue 378). Despite the critical acclaim, sales of the group's albums were not especially high, particularly in the United States, and some critics criticized their music as "passionless", whereas others have praised the group and noted the influence of blues music in their songs. Generally, their first eponymous album was received positively.

== Discography ==
=== Albums ===
Kiss of the Gypsy

- 1991 – Kiss of the Gypsy

Thirty

- 2022 – Thirty

Tony Mitchell's Kingdom of Deadmen

- 2010 - Black Rhapsody

Boneyard Zombies

- 2012 - Death Rattle and Roll

=== Singles ===
- "Whatever it Takes"
- "Easy Does It"
- "Blind For Love"
- "Forever Loved"
