= Thundersqueak Records =

British independent record label

- Founded: 2002
- Status: Active
- Distributor(s): Routenote
- Genre: Various
- Country of origin: UK

Thundersqueak Records is a British independent record label that was founded in Blackpool, England, in 2002 initially for the sole purpose of releasing records by the band Uncle Fester. The label's name is taken from the title of the book by Liz Angerford, Ambrose Lea and Ramsey Dukes.

In 2014, the label significantly expanded its roster of artists, acquiring and releasing recordings made by artists from the northwest of England over the preceding 30 years. During the period February to April 2014 alone, the label issued over 30 albums by 10 bands and artists, encompassing disparate genres from classical music and dixieland to punk rock and synthpop.

In May 2014, Thundersqueak began an extensive re-release programme of rare 1950s rockabilly, rock and roll and doo wop on the series of compilation albums, Rockabilly Rock and Roll Nuggets, Volumes 1-26 - The Rare, the Rarer and the Rarest Rockers and Doo Wop Nuggets Volumes 1-4 - lost vocal groups of the fifties - The rare, The rarer and the rarest of Doo Wop.

== Thundersqueak artists ==
- The Alien Brain
- Another Dimension
- Beaver
- Bill Swing
- Brain One
- The Clapton Cooder Project
- The Crawlin' Hex
- Duncan Jowitt
- Final Solution
- Gothic Philharmonic
- Les Moore's French Quarter Band
- Lucifer
- Lynch Twins
- Mockingbone
- Shining Sons
- The Skull Cowboy
- Somewhere in England
- The Synthesizer
- UFX
- Zoo Boutique
