= Earthling Society =

English rock band

- Origin: Blackpool, Cleveleys and Fleetwood, England
- Genres: Space rock; psychedelic rock; jam band; progressive rock
- Years active: 2004–2018
- Label: Fruits de Mer
- Spinoffs: The Crawlin' Hex
- Members: Fred Laird; Jon Blacow; Kim Allen; Neil Whitehead
- Past members: David Fyall; Joe Orban; Kevy Canavan; Steve Roberts; Dunk Jowitt

Earthling Society were an English space rock band formed in Fleetwood, England in January 2004 by vocalist/guitarist Fred Laird and drummer Jon Blacow with bassist, David Fyall.

The band's debut album Albion was self-recorded by the band on its own 8 track studio and Santiago, Chile's Mylodon Records, were set to release the album in March 2005 before pulling out. When the band was seeking a deal for their next album, Berlin-based Nasoni Records heard Albion and released it on CD and vinyl formats. In August 2005 it was album of the month on Julian Cope's Head Heritage website, Cope stating that "Earthling Society is a 21st century guitar/bass/drums trio from Blackpool, in the north-west of England, that multi-tracks itself in such a manner that its debut album ALBION comes on more like your typical Krautrock commune ensemble (Amon Düül II, Agitation Free especially) than the Blue Cheer, Grand Funk and High Rise heart attack that the power trio line-up would suggest."

The band added keyboard player Joe Orban to its line up and released a follow-up on Nasoni Plastic Jesus And The Third Eye Blind after supporting Cope on his 2006 "Dark Orgasm" tour. Subsequently, Irish keyboard player Kevy Canavan replaced Orban.

During the winter of 2006, Earthing Society began their third studio album, a double LP entitled Tears Of Andromeda, Black Sails Against The Sky. It was released by Nasoni on 20 April 2007 to coincide with the band's debut appearance at the Roadburn Festival, which was broadcast live on several European radio stations. A live track from the performance subsequently appeared on a 2008 compilation album Under The Radar Vol. 4.

In May 2007, Earthling Society released the album Beauty and the Beast on London-based label 4Zero. A departure from the band's earlier space-rock explorations, the album contained 10 much more concise songs and was well received by the underground music press. It was the final album to feature Canavan and Fyall. UK based record distribution company Cargo Records officially released the band's entire back catalogue in the UK in September 2007 and in August 2008, Orban returned to the group after a long illness. Fyall was also replaced by bassist Steve Roberts for Sci-Fi Hi-Fi (2009), the band's second album for 4Zero.

Earthling Society released a number of selected cover versions of 60's garage rock classics on Fruits de Mer Records compilations and in 2013 the band released the Zodiak album featuring new members Kim Allen (Bass) and Neil Whitehead (electronics).

In September 2014, Riot Season Records released a limited edition of 500 translucent green coloured vinyl LPs by the band: England Have My Bones, featuring a live rendition of Alice Coltrane's "Journey in Satchidananda".

In August 2014, Laird announced that he and Blacow had formed a new rock n roll / rockabilly band, The Crawlin' Hex, with punk/psychobilly singer Dunk Jowitt previously of UFX/Boneyard Zombies, Chad Spandosa (also ex UFX) on bass and son Harry Laird on rhythm guitar. Seven singles and several other releases by The Crawlin' Hex had been made available as online downloads and a 7" single 'I'm a Living Sickness' released by Fruits De Mer Records as part of the 'Postcards from the Deep' box set in 2014 before the band split in 2015. In 2014, Jowitt joined briefly Earthling Society on synthesizers.

The album It's Your Love That's Sound was released as a free download on Valentine's Day 2015.

The album Sweet Chariot was released in April 2016.

== Discography ==
=== Albums ===
- 2005 – Albion
- 2006 – Plastic Jesus And The Third Eye Blind
- 2007 – Tears Of Andromeda, Black Sails Against The Sky
- 2007 – Beauty And The Beast
- 2009 – Sci-Fi Hi-Fi
- 2011 – Stations Of The Ghost
- 2013 – Zodiak
- 2014 – England Have My Bones
- 2015 – It's Your Love That's Sound
- 2016 – Sweet Chariot
- 2017 – Zen Bastard
- 2018 - Mo - The Demon
