= UFX =

English rock band

- UFX – L-R Johnny Volume, Ratfink, Chad Spandosa, Dunk Rock

Background information
- Also known as: Uncle Fester
- Origin: Blackpool, Lytham St Annes and Fleetwood, England
- Genres: Alternative rock; garage rock; gothic rock; post-punk
- Years active: 2000–2011
- Label: Thundersqueak
- Members: Dunk Rock; Rat Fink; Johnny Volume; Chad Spandosa
- Past members: Doc Virus

UFX are an English rock band formed in Blackpool, Lancashire, England, in 2000. Originally formed under the name Uncls Fester, a garage rock band, the band released self-distributed and independent albums from 2000 to 2004, before changing their name to UFX in 2006, and releasing two more albums under the new name, before going on hiatus in 2011.

== History ==
=== Dunk Rock (Duncan Lewis Jowitt) ===
In 1977, Vi Brator (Stephen Rosser) and Duncan Disorderly (Jowitt) formed short-lived punk rock band Urban Void. Following the band's demise, Jowitt was invited to replace Phil Denton as guitarist in Section 25 just as the band were beginning to make their first live appearances. After they parted company in October 1978, Jowitt formed his own band Final Solution as vocalist/guitarist with David Foster on bass. Final Solution opened the show at the 1979 Blackpool charity concert organised by Section 25, which featured Joy Division and Orchestral Manoeuvres in the Dark and ultimately led to Section 25 being signed to Manchester's influential Factory record label. By 1980, after a series of line-up changes, the band had changed its original inflammatory name to Another Dimension and had settled around a core personnel of Jowitt and Foster with Steve Grice on drums.

In 1982, with the addition of John "Sid" Hayward on synthesisers and Bill Fogel on guitar, the band became Zoo Boutique, after the New York boutique called Zoo that was opened by Peter Noone of Herman's Hermits and Graham Gouldman (later of 10cc in 1969. The name was misspelt as Zoo Bootique on their first release "Love Like a Clown", which was included on the compilation EP "A Drop in the Ocean" on Lightbeat Records. With Fogel replaced by a second keyboard-player in Phil Denton of The Tins, who had released the DIY album "Buying In Bulk" to positive reviews in 1981, Zoo Boutique's sound became increasingly electronic rock and their debut single "Forgive and Forget"/"Happy Families" (also on Lightbeat Records) received national UK prime-time airplay on BBC Radio 1 but failed to chart. This proved to be the height of Zoo Boutique's commercial success and without a record deal, the band persisted through further line-up changes before Jowitt finally folded the band in 1985 to form Gothic Rock/rockabilly band (Snakeman And The) Headhunters, with Mark Channing on bass, Paul Jepson on guitar and Hayward reverting to drums. In 2014, Zoo Boutique's singles and a number of previously unreleased recordings were compiled by Thundersqueak and released as the "Forgotten" album along with an album "Two Sane Men", which was recorded in 1985 and shelved for almost 30 years.

When Hayward left in 1988, Jowitt joined Pete Graham (guitar), Peter Terras (bass) and Alex Darbyshire (drums) to form Fleetwood's Shining Sons, adopting the stagename "Morax". Shining Sons split in 1992, having released only one six-track cassette "Limited Edition" in 1989, which was expanded and released as a self-titled album in 2014. Jowitt joined Blackpool punk band Pink Torpedoes in 1993, leaving in 1995 following a concert at the British Snowboarding Championships in the French Alps. Since 1994 he has released occasional solo material under the name Lucifer and Lewis "Cypher", many in limited editions deliberately designed to be unplayable without access to certain now-obsolete playback devices. These include a series of six groundbreaking "Cyber Punk Rock" tracker module floppy disk EPs in 1994-95 playable only on Commodore Amiga computers, the first three volumes of which included the first full vocal songs to be released for playback on a computer, and an (audio only) single on betamax videocassette. The recordings on the first "Cyber Punk Rock" disk were two full length cover versions of songs by the Ramones: "Beat on the Brat" and "I Don't Care", chosen because of the minimal lyrical variation between the verses. All the Lucifer floppy disk releases were reissued as "Cyber Punk" album and a double album "Cyber Zone" as Internet-only downloads alongside more recent recordings made under the name Lucifer

In 1996, Jowitt's Mockingbone studio project with Shaun Vincent Gair also self-released two limited edition CD albums "Mockingbone" and "A Mix Bag". and the compilation "A Very Mixed Bag Indeed" in 1997. Mockingbone's "musics" were remastered, repackaged and re-released in 2014 as five separate EPs and albums: "Mockingbone", "Trance", "Mentell", "EnTrance" and "Song Cycle".

=== Rat Fink (Andrew Wilson) ===
A fan club member of gothic rock band Alien Sex Fiend, Wilson first met singer Nik Fiend when Lytham St Annes band The Turnpike Cruisers landed a support slot with the band. By 1986 he was drumming for the Turnpikes when they supported Alien Sex Fiend in Hammersmith, London and shortly afterwards Nik Fiend asked him to join the band. Fiend gave Wilson the stage name Rat Fink Jr. when he joined as drummer and guitarist and he subsequently toured and recorded with them until 1992. Rat's time with Alien Sex Fiend along with frank and honest details of his personal life is thoroughly documented in the book "Once Upon a Fiend".

He subsequently returned to Blackpool and played with United States of Mind, a band which also featured future Earthling Society drummer Jon Blacow on percussion. Wilson would spend the rest of the 1990s awaiting a recall from Fiend and sitting in on drums with various bands.

In 1996, Wilson and Jowitt met when both were employed as actors for the first season of Blackpool's interactive horror show Pasaje Del Terror, where Rat played the role of Dracula.

=== Guitarist Johnny Volume and bassist Chad Spandosa (Nick Turner) ===
In 1983, 19-year-old bassist Chad Spandosa formed Skreem with drummer Kim Sweeney, British marathon drumming champion (59 hours 30 minutes & 32 seconds) from 2004 to 2008. Spandosa then joined Johnny Thunders/Ron Asheton/Stooges-inspired guitarist Johnny Volume and Iggy Pop-obsessed singer "The Blay" (Colin Blaylock) in Blackpool's Dog Food who, with a succession of different drummers, were a permanent fixture on the Blackpool music scene throughout the rest of the 1980s and most of the 1990s including touring with Dunk Rock's Headhunters in 1986. Dog Food were joined by Rat Fink on drums shortly before the band split permanently in 1998.

== 1999–2005 – The Uncle Fester years ==
Drummer Rat Fink and guitarist Johnny Volume band first got together in 1999 with the idea of playing "junk rock" (a term coined by Kerrang! magazine to describe classic garage rock bands like The Stooges, New York Dolls and MC5 and newer bands like Buckcherry, Nashville Pussy and Sweden's Backyard Babies). Jowitt was recruited on vocals (the name Dunk Rock was given to him at the first rehearsal by Volume) and Doc Virus completed the line-up on bass. In June 2000, Virus was replaced by Spandosa.

Adopting the name Uncle Fester, the band released debut album Frump Experiments in 2000 as a limited pressing. This was sold only to fans at the band's gigs. The band's first full release was "Total Sonic Mayhem" on the Thundersqueak label in 2002. TSM consisted half of remastered songs from Frump Experiments alongside several newly written tracks. It was deleted the following year as soon as the initial pressing had sold out. The 2004 album/EP Offensive consisted of four new songs and four previously released songs, including live favourite "Idiot", as bonus tracks.

In 2005, Uncle Fester appeared performing "Top Down" (from 2005's "Offensive") in the independent Ten:10 movie by Northwest Films and were also filmed performing live for Channel 4's Bed and Bardsley TV series (a spin off of the successful Wife Swap series featuring the family of Lizzy Bardsley). The band had previously appeared opposite Amanda Holden and James Bradshaw as a gang of punk rockers in the ultimate scene (set in a punk rock club) of the final episode of the third and last series of The Grimleys, Granada Television's popular comedy show in 2001 in which Ratfink played the character Gordon Bates and Johnny Volume played the part of the punk DJ.

== 2006 onwards – UFX ==
In 2006, the band changed its name to UFX and released the album 'Crack, the band's first since 2002 to consist entirely of new material. The album's cover art featured the work of Parisien photographer Gui Brigaudiot. The band simultaneously made all their recordings released as Uncle Fester available as free mp3 downloads on the band's website.

In 2009 UFX released Sick Sick Sex, another album of entirely original material, which featured Nick Gribbon (who had been a member of Blackpool's The Rockin' Vickers in 1964–65 at the same time as Lemmy of Hawkwind and Motörhead)), on harmonica on "Rattlesnake" (a song which had been first recorded with an entirely different backing in 1989 by Shining Sons).

UFX recorded 12 original tracks intended for their sixth album shortly before the band went on extended hiatus in October 2011 with the album still awaiting completion. The break was ostensibly to allow members of the band the opportunity to pursue other interests: Ratfink with Vince Ripper and The Rodent Show - a Live Show combining a DJ set of classic 50/60's Garage Rock n Roll with live instrumentation, Chad with his Inner Temple side project and Dunk with guitarist Tony Mitchell, previously of Kiss of the Gypsy in Gothic rock/Psychobilly band Boneyard Zombies, which also featured Andy "Wild Dice" Wilkinson and Tommy Couch, the rhythm section of hardcore punk band One Way System. This followed an earlier studio collaboration with Mitchell in Puppetmaster, which had resulted in one EP released in 2011. In 2012, Boneyard Zombies released the album "Death Rattle and Roll".

In 2013, mixing of the UFX tracks recorded in 2011 was finally completed and the album released as "Reverse Engineering (Exits Exist)". There are no plans for the band to reconvene to promote the album as Volume has announced that he has "retired". A controversial video using allegedly hoax footage from Alternative 3, the Roswell alien autopsy and footage of Nazi flying saucers was released to accompany the title track of the album.

Despite the group's live inactivity since 2011, UFX (along with Mockingbone and Puppetmaster) have remained in the Top Five chart on Internet station Mohawk Radio Show, the main radio station for the Punk, Psychobilly, Hardcore, Alternative Community, since 2008.

All of the Uncle Fester and UFX albums were remastered and re-released as Internet downloads in March 2014.

In June 2014, Spandosa and Rock joined Fred Laird and Jon Blacow of Earthling Society to form rock n roll band The Crawlin' Hex.

== Discography ==
=== Albums ===
- 2000 – Uncle Fester - Frump Experiments
- 2002 – Uncle Fester - Total Sonic Mayhem
- 2004 – Uncle Fester - Offensive
- 2006 – UFX - Crack
- 2009 – UFX - Sick Sick Sex
- 2013 – UFX - Reverse Engineering (Exits Exist)

=== Various artist compilations ===
- The Ugly Truth About Blackpool Volume 1, 2005
- Conform Or Die, 2005
- The Ugly Truth About Blackpool Volume 2, 2006

*Misery of Sound, 2007

=== Side project releases ===
- 2010 - Puppetmaster - My Name is Death (EP)
- 2012 - Boneyard Zombies - Death Rattle and Roll
- 2012 - Various - Blackout Crypthology (features tracks by both Boneyard Zombies and Vince Ripper and the Rodent Show)
- 2013 - Vince Ripper and the Rodent Show - Live From The Boneyard (DVD)
- 2014 - The Crawlin' Hex - I'm a Living Sickness flexi-disc single on Postcards From the Deep box set
- 2015 - The Crawlin' Hex - Who Do You Love on Strange Fruit and Veg compilation CD
- 2015 - Vince Ripper and the Rodent Show - It's Fun to Be a Monster (cd)
