= Tim A. Duncan =

- Genres: Pop music, Classical music, Rock Music Orchestral, Stage (theatre), Musical theatre
- Occupations: Composer, Producer, Conductor, Sound Engineer, Audio Engineer, Audio mixing (recorded music), Record producer
- Years active: 1987–present

Tim A. Duncan, born Manchester, England, is a composer, conductor and sound engineer best known for his work around the world on major Ice dance shows also with recordings featuring artists including Joe Longthorne, Chris Farlowe, Ruby Turner, One Way System, and the Brass & Voices of Wales.

In 2007 a production of Swan Lake featuring Duncan's completely rearranged score by Pyotr Ilyich Tchaikovsky received "Best Touring Theatrical Show 2007" for the season at The Lowry, Salford by the Manchester Evening News.

== Early life ==
Duncan was educated at Queen Elizabeth's Grammar School, Middleton, Greater Manchester. In 1974 he joined the Middleton Band, playing Tenor Horn conducted at the time by Gordon Dean, whilst receiving tuition on French Horn from Ifor James and Michael Purton. He also joined the Besses o' th' Barn Band, later studying theory and composition at the Royal College of Music, London.

== Career ==
From 1987 Duncan has worked in sound engineering with notable artists in studios across the country, including Parr Street Studios Liverpool, Strawberry Studios Stockport, Abbey Road Studios London and MosFilm Studio Moscow.and from 1996 has been involved in theatrical collaborations including Cinderella on Ice (composer), Swan Lake on Ice (arranger and conductor) and Sleeping Beauty on Ice (arranger and conductor) with the Imperial Ice Stars as well as Peter Pan on Ice (composer) in 2019. Prior to working with the Imperial Ice Stars he recorded scores for The Phantom of the Opera on Ice (sound engineer and arranger), The Nutcracker on Ice (arranger and conductor) and Barnum on Ice (composer) with the Russian Ice Stars. In 1998 he began recording "Credo" with producer Roberto Danova in Armenia, Georgia, Italy, Israel, Russia and England, the final album of which was then released in the millennium year.

== Discography ==
- All Music:
- Discogs:
