= One Way System =

British punk rock band

- Origin: Fleetwood, Lancashire, England
- Genres: Punk rock, street punk, Oi!
- Years active: 1979–1986, 1995–present
- Labels: Beat The System, Anagram, Captain Oi!, Cleopatra, GMM, Cherry Red
- Members: Tommy Couch; David Ross; Andy Wilkinson; Aaron Davies
- Past members: Z Jay Susel; Craig Halliday; Tez Mcdonald; Gavin Whyte; Andy Gibson; Gary Buckley; Lee Havok; Nigel Crosthwaite; Dave Brown; Peter Machin; Steve Brittain

One Way System are an English punk rock band formed in the Fleetwood, Lancashire, in 1979.

== Career ==
One Way System's initial line-up consisted of Craig Halliday (guitar), Gavin Whyte (vocals), Bob Grant(drums) and Gaz Buckley (bass). A demo of the song Jerusalem, recorded by that lineup, was later included on the A Country Fit For Heroes compilation album, released in January 1982 - Catalogue number Oi3 - which reached No. 4 in the UK Indie Charts. David Ross of Poulton-Le-Fylde band Zyklon B joined as second guitarist and in 1981 Blackpool's Lightbeat/Beat The System label released the No Entry EP: A-side Stab The Judge, B-side Riot Torn City and Me and You, featuring all 5 musicians.

The first ever record released by One Way System was "Stab the Judge", financed by Craig Halliday

After some early personnel changes (Tez Mcdonald joined The Fits and Craig Halliday left following a disagreement regarding a broken Gibson SG, resurfacing years later in Sick 56), the line-up settled down with Gav Whyte on vocals, Dave "Crabby" Ross on guitar, Gary Buckley on bass and Tommy Couch on drums.

The Give Us A Future 7-inch was the first release (Halliday, Couch, Whyte, Ross & Buckley) (ANA1) on Cherry Red's Anagram Records in 1982. In the same year, Anagram also re-released No Entry as the Stab The Judge EP (OWS2) and the single version of Jerusalem. One Way System became Anagram Records's first signing with the release of the All Systems Go LP, following the Give Us A Future 7-inch indie chart success and the band being featured on the front cover of UK national music paper Sounds.

Between 1982 and 1984, the band had five Indie Chart hit singles and two Top Ten albums. A U.S. West Coast tour alongside Circle Jerks in 1984 was abandoned when Circle Jerks vocalist Keith Morris broke his neck, although the band managed to salvage one date with Suicidal Tendencies. In 1985 Gav Whyte was replaced on vocals by Andy Gibson of Preston punk band The Genocides and the band remained signed to Anagram until they split in early 1986 with enough songs written for an unreleased third album.

Tom Couch then spent two years with the U.K. Subs and has since been voted one of the best punk drummers of all time. One Way System was resurrected in 1995 with Gavin Whyte returning after Captain Oi! re-released All Systems Go and Writing On The Wall in CD format. Gaz Buckley left the band to be replaced by Dave Brown for a ten date European Tour. Brown was replaced in turn by Andy Wilkinson and, in 1996, Cleopatra issued a Best Of collection. In 1996, whilst working on a new album, Gavin Whyte left the band and was replaced by longtime fan Lee Havok (real name Lee Pinkney) and it was with this line-up that undertook a tour of Japan.

A new CD, Waiting For Zero was released through GMM in 1998 and Cherry Red released a Singles Collection in 2003. The 2005 various artists compilation CD Give Us A Future (The History Of Anagram Records 1982-1987) took its name from the One Way System single of that name.

More recently, White South African Lee Havok was replaced by ukNige (ex of Pink Torpedoes and, with OWS founder member Craig Halliday, Sick 56) on vocals and ukNige was then replaced by Jay Susel. In 2011, Couch and Wilkinson, while remaining in One Way System, joined singer Dunk Rock (UFX) and guitarist Tony Mitchell (Kiss of The Gypsy) in gothic psychobilly band Boneyard Zombies, releasing the Death Rattle and Roll album in 2012. Both bands appeared at the 2012 Rebellion Festival in Blackpool. The band toured the U.S. West Coast in 2013. Gaz Buckley is currently in Aussie punk band The Terraces.

The release of Car Bombs in Babylon sees One Way System continue to tour worldwide.

== Selected discography ==
Chart placings shown are from the UK Indie Chart.

=== Albums ===
- All Systems Go (LP, Anagram 1983) No. 11 (Halliday, Couch, Whyte, Ross & Buckley)
- Writing On The Wall (LP, Anagram Records 1983) No. 6
- The Best of One Way System (CD, Anagram Records 1995)
- Forgotten Generation (CD, Cleopatra Records 1996)
- Return In Breizh Live (CD, Visionary Records 1997)
- Waiting For Zero (CD, GMM 1999)
- Singles Collection (CD Cherry Red 2003)
- Gutter Box Album Collection (3×LP Box, Get Back Records (Italy) 1997))
- Car Bombs In Babylon (OWS Records) (2019) (Vinyl))

=== Singles ===
- "Stab The Judge / Riot Torn City" (7-inch EP, Beat The System 1982) (Halliday, Couch, Whyte, Ross & Buckley)
- "Give Us A Future / Just Another Hero" (7-inch, Anagram, 1982) No. 28 (Halliday, Couch, Whyte, Ross & Buckley)
- "Jerusalem / Jackie Was A Junkie" (7-inch, Anagram 1982) No. 22 (Halliday, Couch, Whyte, Ross & Buckley)
- "Cum On Feel The Noize / Breakin` In" (7-inch, Anagram 1983) No. 11 (Halliday, Couch, Whyte, Ross & Buckley)
- "This Is The Age / Into The Fires" (EP, Anagram 1983) No. 21
- "Visions Of Angels" (12-inch EP, Anagram 1984) No. 39
- "OWS Live In Rennes" (7-inch EP, Mass Productions France 1995)
- "Believe Yourself / Search Your Soul" (7-inch, Bricks Records Japan 1997)
- "Leave Me Alone" (CD EP, Cleopatra Records USA 1997)
- "Not Your Enemy / Shut Up (7-inch, Soap and Spikes Records Canada 1998)
- "Masks of Society" (CD EP, Video Single & on line Release) 2011)

=== Compilations ===
- A Country Fit For Heroes (Compilation Album) Jerusalem (No Future Records) - 1982
- All Systems Go (Video), Live in Manchester (Jettisoundz) - 1983
- Punk And Disorderly vol. 3 ('Give Us a Future' (Anagram Records) - 1983
- Singles Collection (CD, Cherry Red 2003)
- Give Us A Future (The History Of Anagram Records 1982-1987) (Compilation Album) Give Us a Future, Jerusalem (Anagram Records) - 2005
- The Ugly Truth About Blackpool (Compilation Album) Jerusalem (Just Say No To Government Music) - 2005
- The Ugly Truth About Blackpool, Vol.2 (Compilation Album) This Could Be You (Just Say No To Government Music) - 2006
- Still Our Future You`re Messing Up (Compilation Album) Kick In The Head & This Could Be You -(Vile Records) - 2010
- Masks of Society (Music Video) - 2011
