= Fleetwood Pier =

Pleasure pier in Fleetwood, England

Coordinates: 53.9286°N 3.0125°W

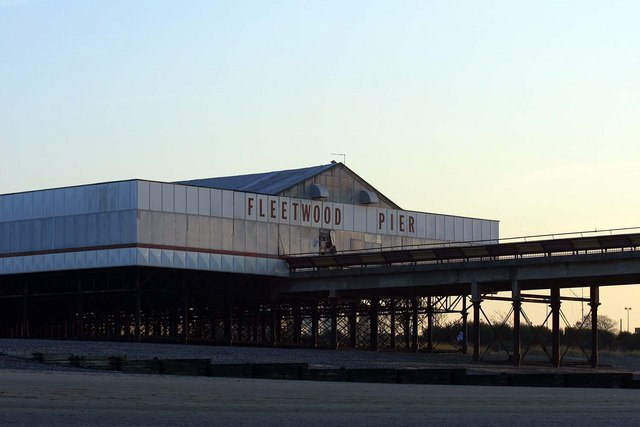
- Pier in 2007
- Type: Pleasure Pier
- Location: Fleetwood, Lancashire
- Official name: Fleetwood Pier

Characteristics
- Total length: 492 feet (150 m)

History
- Designer: G. T. Lumb
- Opening date: 16 May 1910; 116 years ago
- Closure date: 2008
- Location in Fleetwood

Fleetwood Pier, also known as the Victoria Pier, was a pleasure pier located in the English town of Fleetwood, Lancashire. At 492 feet (150 m) in length, it was one of the shortest piers in the country. It was built in 1910 at the end of the golden age of pier building, and other than a 1957 pier built in Deal, Kent to replace a structure damaged in World War II, it was the last pleasure pier to be built in the United Kingdom. The building was destroyed by fire and demolished in 2008.

== History ==
Fleetwood Pier opened on Whit Monday in 1910, a pavilion was added the following year, and a cinema was opened in 1942. The pier was badly damaged on 25 August 1952 after a fire started in the cinema, and did not fully reopen until 1958. At different times, it was an amusement complex, bar and dance hall. The Stefani family were the longest owners in the pier's history, owning and running Fleetwood Pier from the 1960s until 2000. The pier was first closed in 2000 when its owners went into liquidation, but it was reopened under new ownership in 2003, after Roger Stefani sold it. Safety concerns forced the pier to shut once more, and when it was gutted by fire in September 2008 it had been closed for almost two years. At that time, the owners, Simmo Developments, had submitted plans to convert the structure into an apartment complex.

== 2008 fire ==
The 2008 Fleetwood Pier fire began during the early hours of 9 September 2008 and resulted in the pier's destruction. The fire was reported to the emergency services at 4:30am after a member of the public saw smoke rising from one of the buildings, and firefighters from Lancashire Fire and Rescue Service attended the scene. The pier was severely damaged.

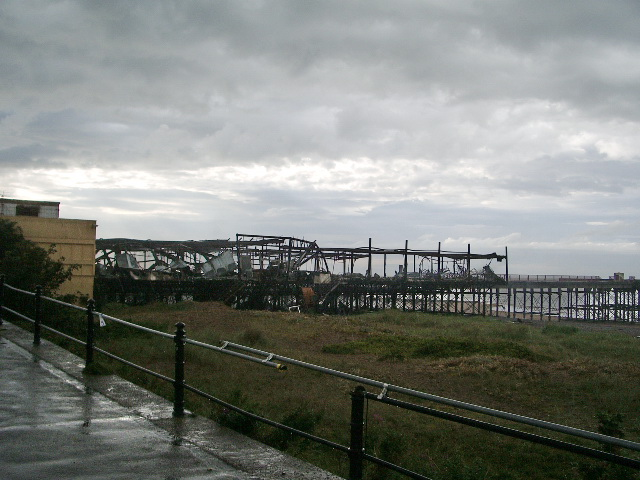
The remains of Fleetwood Pier in 2008

An investigation was put in place to determine the cause of the blaze. On 26 September 2008, Wyre Borough Council, citing safety concerns, announced that the pier would be completely demolished, within two to three weeks. On 10 October 2008, the Council confirmed that the pier would not be rebuilt. Plans for apartments on the site were approved in 2017, although only for 15 apartments for over-55s and some retail units, not for the full development of 85 apartments.
