= Chemistry set (disambiguation) =

A chemistry set is an educational toy enabling simple chemistry experiments.

Chemistry set may also refer to:

- Chemistry Set (band), from Seattle, Washington, featured on the 1988 compilation album Sub Pop 200
- The Chemistry Set (British band), London, England psych-pop band, 1988-present
- The Chemistry Set (American band), Dallas, Texas, mid-2000s
- Chemistry Set: Songs of the Suburbs 1977–1987, a 2003 compilation album by The Suburbs
