= Craig Padilla =

American musician

Craig Padilla is an American ambient musician, film score composer, actor, and video producer from Redding, California.

== Biography ==
Since the mid-1990s he has released more than a dozen albums with music primarily inspired by the Berlin School of electronic music and space music on the labels Space For Music, Spotted Peccary Music, Lotuspike, Fruits de Mer Records, and Groove Unlimited, and contributed to compilations, including a tribute album to Michael Garrison. He also edits and produces videos for local television commercials, infomercials, corporate events, and music videos.

== Reception ==
Jim Brenholts (Allmusic) describes Padilla as "one of the premier Berlin school sequencers in the U.S.A." while Stewart Mason (also Allmusic) calls him a "Berlin-based electronic music guru" which is factually a misleading as Padilla is based in California.

== Discography ==
The discography includes only albums released on CD, digital download, and vinyl.

- Eye of the Storm (Peace, 1996)
- Patterns of Thought (Peace, 1998)
- The Soul Within (Peace, 1999)
- Beyond Beta with Skip Murphy (Peace, 1999)
- Crystal Garden (Peace, 1999)
- Beyond Volume 1 with Skip Murphy (Peace, 1999)
- Edge of Eternity (Peace, 1999)
- Eccentric Spheres (Peace, 2000)
- Music for the Mind - Live (Vol. 1) (Peace, 2000)
- Music for the Mind - Live (Vol. 2) (Peace, 2000)
- Perspectives on the Dreamworld (Peace, 2000)
- Reflections in Mercury with Skip Murphy (Peace, 2001)
- Temporal Suspension with Skip Murphy (Space For Music 2001)
- Folding Space and Melting Galaxies (Space For Music 2002)
- Vostok (Spotted Peccary, 2002)
- Planetary Elements with Skip Murphy (Space For Music, 2003)
- Echo System with Paul Ellis (GROOVE Unlimited, March 2004)
- Genesis (Spotted Peccary, May 2004)
- Planetary Elements (Volume 2) with Skip Murphy (Space For Music, 2005)
- Path of Least Resistance with Zero Ohms (Lotuspike, 2005)
- Phantasma with Skip Murphy (GROOVE Unlimited, 2006)
- The Light in the Shadow (Spotted Peccary, 2006)
- Analog Destination with Skip Murphy (GROOVE Unlimited, 2008)
- Below the Mountain (Spotted Peccary, 2008)
- Cycles (Hemi-Sync / Monroe Institute, 2008)
- Beyond the Portal with Zero Ohms & Skip Murphy (Lotuspike, 2009)
- The Heart of The Soul (Spotted Peccary, 2012)
- When The Earth Is Far Away with Zero Ohms (Lotuspike, 2012)
- strange fish 1 shared LP with Sendelica (Fruits de Mer, 2013)
- Sonar double LP (Fruits de Mer, 2014)
- Land of Spirit (Hemi-Sync / Monroe Institute, 2014)
- Life Flows Water with Howard Givens (Spotted Peccary, 2015)
- Short Circuits lathe-cut LP (Fruits de Mer, 2015)
- Spirit Holy Rising EP/single with Howard Givens (Spotted Peccary, 2015)
- Heaven Condensed (Spotted Peccary, 2016)
- Awakening Consciousness with Howard Givens (Hemi-Sync / Monroe Institute, 2016)
- Being of Light with Howard Givens (Spotted Peccary, 2017)
- Patterns of Thought (Special Remastered Edition) (Peace, 2017)
- The Heart of the Galaxy (Special Remastered Edition) (Peace, 2018)
- Aquarii (Limited Edition) (Peace, 2018)
- Tenderness Avalanche as THE FELLOWSHIP OF HALLUCINATORY VOYAGERS (with Pete Bingham) (FRG, 2019)
- Toward the Horizon with Marvin Allen (Spotted Peccary, 2019)
- The Bodhi Mantra with Howard Givens (Spotted Peccary, 2020)
- Waveforms with Skip Murphy (Peace, 2020)
- Strange Gravity with Marvin Allen (Spotted Peccary, 2021)
- Precipice of a Dream with Howard Givens and Madhavi Devi (Spotted Peccary, 2021)
- Perspectives on the Dreamworld (20th Anniversary Edition) (Peace, 2021)
- Discovery of Meaning (Spotted Peccary, 2022)
- Universe (30th Anniversary Edition) with Skip Murphy (Peace, 2022)
- Weathering the Storm with Marvin Allen (Spotted Peccary, 2023)
- Unfolding Skies with Marvin Allen (Spotted Peccary, 2026)

== Film scores ==
- Phobias (Fear Film/Sub Rosa Studios, 2003)
- Realms of Blood with Skip Murphy (Fear Film/Sub Rosa Studios, 2004)
- Dark Woods (JDB/Alliance, 2006)
- Space Crüesader Xbox 360 video game (Unfinity Games, 2012)

== Voice acting ==
- Hans Bearnt in Growlanser II: The Sense of Justice video game for PlayStation 2 (Working Designs, 2004)
- Bulrell in Summon Night 6: Lost Borders video game for PlayStation 4 and PSVita (Gaijinworks, 2017)
