= Jet Age (disambiguation) =

The Jet Age is a period of history defined by the social change brought about by the advent of large aircraft powered by turbine engines.

Jet Age may also refer to:

- Jet Age (Superjesus album)
- Jet Age, an album by the Norwegian band Kåre and the Cavemen
- The Jet Age, an American rock band
