= Fruits de Mer Records =

British record label

- Fruits de Mer Records' logo
- Parent company: Bracken Records (2008–2010)
- Founded: 2008
- Founder: Keith Jones, Andy Bracken
- Status: Active
- Distributor(s): Clear Spot International; Heyday Mail Order
- Genre: Psychedelic rock; psychedelic folk; folk rock; space rock; krautrock
- Country of origin: England
- Location: Walton-on-Thames, Surrey
- Official website: www.fruitsdemerrecords.com

Fruits de Mer Records is a British independent record label based in Walton-on-Thames, Surrey, England, established by Keith Jones and Andy Bracken in 2008. It releases psychedelic rock, psychedelic folk, folk rock, space rock and krautrock music, with an international roster of artists spanning from the 1960s to the present.

The record label principally releases music on phonograph record format, but compact disc is commonly used for its Various Artists compilations, while compact cassettes have also been issued. Some of the outputs are reissues of classic albums or singles, while others are modern takes on psychedelia. The company has several imprints, including Regal Crabomophone, Strange Fish, Friends of the Fish, Head Cleaner and Tiny, which have their own series of catalogue numbers, but are treated like standard Fruits de Mer Records releases.

The organization is also responsible for coordinating an annual psychedelic music festival since 2013, originally named the Summer Fruits de Mer All-Dayer. In 2014, the event was renamed Crabstock: The Fruits de Mer Records Festival of Psychedelia. The following year, the showcase became a three-day event and was renamed The Dream of Dr. Sardonicus: A Festival of Psychedelia, which continues to take place annually at The Cellar Bar and Art Gallery in Cardigan, Wales. The bands' performances at the festival are often recorded and released by the record label.

== History ==
Prior to forming Fruits de Mer Records, Andy Bracken operated his own record company, Bracken Records, which existed from 2004 to 2010. He and Keith Jones got together in early 2008 to establish Fruits de Mer Records, which was operated as an imprint label of Bracken Records, and remained as such until the closure of the parent company in late 2010. Fruits de Mer Records' early releases featured cover versions of classic songs interpreted by modern bands. In 2011, Bracken and Jones established the imprint Regal Crabomophone, with the intention of releasing original songs by modern bands. Outputs through Fruits de Mer Records bare catalog numbers starting with the word crustacean, while those released through Regal Crabomophone bare catalog numbers starting with the word winkle.

Bracken left the partnership in 2012, shortly after relocating to Virginia, United States. Jones has since assumed full ownership and continues to operate the record label with occasional help from his family and of close musical collaborators. In 2013, Jones established the imprint Strange Fish, with the intention of releasing bands and artists whose genres go beyond what Fruits de Mer Records and Regal Crabomophone normally released; mainly more experimental or hard-to-categorize artists. Outputs through Strange Fish bare catalog numbers starting with the words strange fish. In June 2013, Record Collector magazine released the Various Artists compilation Plankton: A Fruits de Mer Collection, as part of its Rare Vinyl Series, which includes a selection of material from the label's out-of-print releases.

In 2014, Jones established the imprint Friends of the Fish. The purpose of this imprint has been expanded over the years, but generally includes limited-edition lathe cut vinyls, series of Various Artists compilation albums given out for free to Fruits de Mer Records Club members and at live events and festivals, and releases financed by bands that benefit from Fruits de Mer Records' distribution network and fan-base. Outputs through Friends of the Fish Fish bare catalog numbers starting with the words friends of the fish and generally also include the Fruits de Mer Records logo. Jones established the imprint Head Cleaner in 2015, with the intention of releasing cassette tape-format albums. Outputs through Head Cleaner bare catalog numbers starting with the words head cleaner.

On 20 April 2016, radio disc jockey Gideon Coe dedicated an entire three-hour BBC Radio 6 Music program to Fruits de Mer Records. In March 2018, music journalist Dave Thompson published the book The Incomplete Angler - Ten Years of Fruits de Mer, which chronicles the first ten years of the record label's history, along with an extensive discography of the company's output. The book was released in two editions: the Standard Edition and the Members Club Edition, which comes packaged in a special pouch with additional stickers, flyers, a poster, and vinyl singles. In celebration of its ten-year anniversary, the record label released the Various Artists compilations Goldfish: Fruits de Mer Records 10 Years on Vinyl and The Three Seasons: The Spring, Summer and Autumn of Love. In 2018, Jones launched the imprint Tiny, specifically to release 5” lathe-cut singles. In June 2023, Prog Magazine included an exclusive 17-song Various Artists compilation of Fruits de Mer Records artists with its 141th issue.

== Festivals ==
=== Summer Fruits de Mer All-Dayer (2013) ===
Fruits de Mer Records' first organized showcase concert was named Summer Fruits de Mer All-Dayer, and took place at The Borderline in Central London on 10 August 2013. The event was sponsored by Record Collector magazine and featured England's Pretty Things as headliners, along with Wales' Sendelica, the Netherlands' Jack Ellister, Spain's Stay, and The Luck of Eden Hall from the United States.

=== Crabstock: The Fruits de Mer Records Festival of Psychedelia (2014) ===
The success of the Summer Fruits de Mer All-Dayer lead to the creation of four spin-off, multi-city events: Crabstock: The Fruits de Mer Records Festival of Psychedelia, in 2014. Each single-day event was held in a different city, on a different date, and with different performing bands.

Two events were held in the United States under the name Crabstock USA. The first was held at The Bowery Electric in New York City on 10 April 2014 and featured The Seventh Ring of Saturn, Sky Picnic and King Penguin. The second was held at The Outer Space in Hamden, Connecticut on 11 April 2014 and featured The Seventh Ring of Saturn, Sky Picnic and The Luck of Eden Hall.

The main event, Crabstock, was held at The Cellar Bar and Art Gallery in Cardigan, Wales on 26 April 2014. The showcase featured Sendelica, Earthling Society, Crystal Jacqueline, James McKeown, Jack Ellister and Wally Stagg. Sendelica's performance was recorded and released as Fruits de Mer Records' imprint Friends of the Fish's first release.

The final event was held on 3 May 2014 at Club Darkside in Helsinki, Finland under the name Crabstock on Ice. The artists that performed at the event include Sendelica, Octopus Syng, Us and Them, The Legendary Flower Punk, Jack Ellister and DJ Astro.

=== The Dream of Dr. Sardonicus: A Festival of Psychedelia (2015–present) ===
==== The 13th Dream of Dr. Sardonicus: A Festival of Psychedelia (2015) ====
Following two years of single-day events, Fruits de Mer Records partnered with Sendelica to launch the three-day showcase, The 13th Dream of Dr. Sardonicus: A Festival of Psychedelia (named in honor of progressive rock band Spirit's album Twelve Dreams of Dr. Sardonicus). The event was held from 7 to 9 August 2015 at The Cellar Bar and Art Gallery in Cardigan, Wales, and featured performances by The Bevis Frond, Earthling Society, Astralasia, Sendelica (and Sendelica Acoustica), Soft Hearted Scientists, Schnauser, The Luck of Eden Hall, Magic Bus, The Honey Pot, Spurious Transients, Jack Ellister, Steve Kelly, The Telephones, Paradise 9 and DJ Wally Stagg.

==== The 14th Dream of Dr. Sardonicus Festival of Psychedelia (2016) ====
The 14th Dream of Dr. Sardonicus Festival of Psychedelia was held from 5 to 7 August 2016 at The Cellar Bar and Art Gallery in Cardigan, Wales, and featured performances by Vibravoid, Twink and The Fairies, Sendelica, Ax Genrich and Sunhair, Soft Hearted Scientists, The Telephones, Vert:x, Consterdine, Ted Selke, Gregory Curvey, Andrew McCulloch, Jack Ellister, Deviant Amps, The Blue Giant Zeta Puppies and DJ Wally Stagg.

==== The 15th Dream of Dr. Sardonicus: A Festival of Psychedelia (2017) ====
The 15th Dream of Dr. Sardonicus: A Festival of Psychedelia was held from 4 to 6 August 2017 at The Cellar Bar and Art Gallery in Cardigan, Wales, and featured performances by The Bevis Frond, Sendelica, Anton Barbeau, Fuchsia, Earthling Society, The Cary Grace Band, Babal, The Telephones, The Spookers, Deviant Amps, Chariots, Red Sun, Mark McDowell and Friends and DJ Wally Stagg.

==== The 16th Dream of Dr. Sardonicus: A Festival of Psychedelia (2018) ====
The 16th Dream of Dr. Sardonicus: A Festival of Psychedelia was held from 3 to 5 August 2018 at The Cellar Bar and Art Gallery in Cardigan, Wales, and featured performances by Nik Turner's New Space Ritual, Fuchsia, Sendelica, Stay, Schnauser, The Fertility Cult, Elfin Bow, Nathan Hall and The Sinister Locals, 7shades, Opel, Alain Pire Experience, The Fellowship of Hallucinatory Voyagers, Ash Magna, Consterdine, I Am Voyager I and The Cold Needles.

==== The 17th Dream of Dr. Sardonicus Festival (2019) ====
The 17th Dream of Dr. Sardonicus Festival was held from 7 to 9 August 2019 at The Cellar Bar and Art Gallery in Cardigan, Wales, and featured performances by The Bevis Frond, The Groundhogs, Sendelica, The Chemistry Set, 3D Tanx, Mark McDowell, Sarah Birch, Alain Pire Experience, Moon Goose, Spurious Transients, The Lost Tuesday Society, Elfin Bow, The Fellowship of Hallucinatory Voyagers, I Am Voyager I, Paul Sax and DJ Wally Staggs.

==== The 18th Dream of Dr. Sardonicus Festival (2022) ====
The 18th Dream of Dr. Sardonicus Festival was originally scheduled to take place between 7 and 9 August 2020 but it was postponed due to the COVID-19 pandemic. During the hiatus, The Cellar Bar, where the festival had taken place since 2014, underwent financial difficulties and faced being permanently closed, so Fruits de Mer Records compiled a benefit Various Artists compilation titled We Are The Cellar Bar Restoration Society. The event was rescheduled for 6–8 August 2021, but was again postponed due to the prolonged COVID-19 pandemic. The event was successfully held from 5 to 7 August 2022 at The Cellar Bar and Art Gallery in Cardigan, Wales, and featured performances by Man, The Groundhogs, Fuchsia, Sendelica, Elfin Bow, The Telephones, Spurious Transients, Taras Bulba, Z-Machine, Sonic Trip Project, Sarah Birch, Hanford Flyover, Moon Goose and DJ Benway.

== Artists ==
This is a partial list of artists who record for Fruits de Mer Records, or one of its imprint labels.

- Astralasia
- Anton Barbeau
- Beau
- Beautify Junkyards
- The Bevis Frond
- Chad & Jeremy
- The Chemistry Set
- Rob Clarke
- Computerchemist
- Anla Courtis
- Electric Moon
- Electric Orange
- The Electric Prunes
- Eroc
- Earthling Society
- Ex Norwegian
- Nick Franglen
- Mark Fry
- Fuchsia
- Cary Grace
- The Grand Astoria
- Ilona V
- The Jet Age
- Julie's Haircut
- LoveyDove
- Nick Nicely
- Alison O'Donnell
- Craig Padilla
- Henry Padovani
- Brendan Pollard
- The Pretty Things
- Inna Pivars & The Histriones
- The Re-Stoned
- Paul Roland
- Schizo Fun Addict
- Sendelica
- Damo Suzuki
- Tír na nÓg
- Touch
- Nik Turner
- Vibravoid
- Vision Eternel
- Dan West
- The Yardbirds

== See also ==
- List of record labels
