= The Grand Astoria =

Russian rock band

- Origin: Saint-Petersburg, Russia
- Genres: Psychedelic rock, progressive rock, grunge, heavy metal
- Years active: 2009–present
- Labels: Flower Punk Records, Setalight Records, Fruits de Mer Records
- Members: Kamille Sharapodinov; Danila Danilov
- Website: bandcamp

The Grand Astoria is a Russian rock band from Saint-Petersburg, founded in 2009 by Kamille Sharapodinov.

The current lineup includes:

- Danila Danilov – vocals
- Kamille Sharapodinov – vocals and guitar
- Igor Suvorov – guitar
- Dmitry Ogorodnov – bass
- Albert Vartanov – drums

Their third album, titled Omnipresence, was released on 1 January 2011.

== Discography ==
=== Albums ===
- The Grand Astoria (aka I) (2009)
- II (2010)
- Omnipresence (2011)
- Punkadelia Supreme (2013)
- La Belle Epoque (2014)
- The Mighty Few (2015)

=== EPs ===
- Deathmarch (2013)
- The Process of Weeding Out (Black Flag cover album) (2014)

=== Singles ===
- Caesar Enters the Palace of Doom (2011, 7")
- Then You Win (2013, 7")
- Who's in Charge? (2014, CD-single)

=== Split albums ===
- To Whom It May Concern (split with US Christmas) (2012, 12")
- The Body Limits (split with Montenegro) (2014, CD)
- Blessed, Cursed and Crucified (split with Mother Mars) (2014, 7")
- Kobaia Express (split with Samavayo) (2015, 10")

=== Compilation albums ===
- Cowbells and Cobwebs ("Raise the Dead") (2010, Planetfuzz Records)
- Roqueting Through Space ("Oh, Yeah") (2011, Fruits de Mer Records)
- Son of the Transcendental Maggot ("Light: Look at Your Sun") (2011, Tsuguri Records)
