= Nick Nicely =

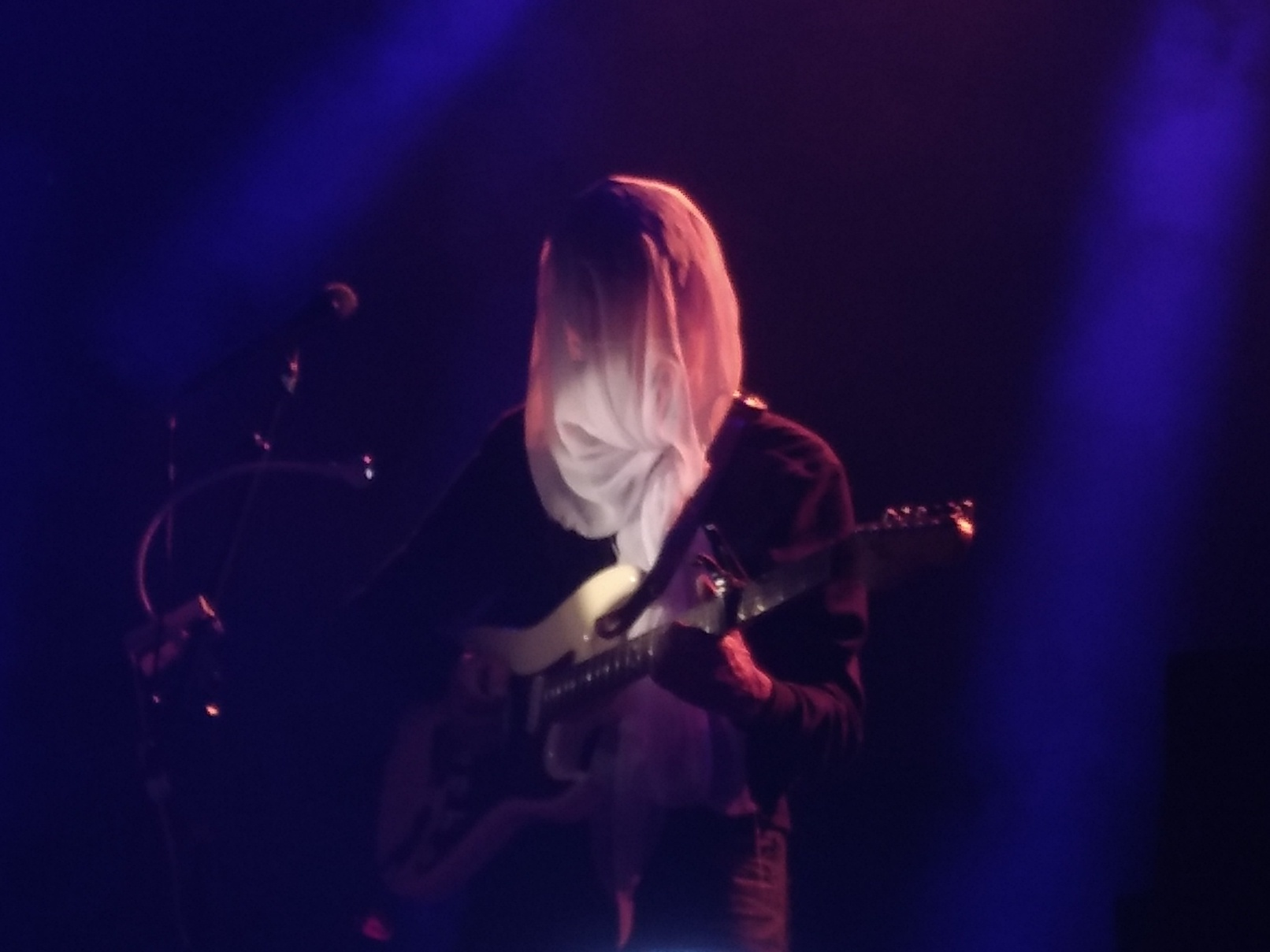
- Nicely performing in Brooklyn, 2019

Background information
- Born: Nickolas Laurien; 1959 (age 66–67); Greenland
- Origin: London, England
- Genres: Psychedelic; electronic
- Occupation: Singer-songwriter
- Instruments: Vocals, keyboards, guitar, synthesiser
- Years active: 1970s–present
- Label: Fruits de Mer Records

Nickolas Laurien (born 1959), known professionally as Nick Nicely (stylised nick nicely), is an English singer-songwriter who records psychedelic and electronic music. He is best known for his 1982 single "Hilly Fields (1892)". Nicely released only one other record in the early 1980s, the single "D.C.T. Dreams", before retreating from the music industry. The influence of "Hilly Fields" has been noted on Bevis Frond, Robyn Hitchcock, Robert Wyatt, and XTC's psychedelic alter egos the Dukes of Stratosphear, as well as the hypnagogic pop movement of the 2000s.

Nicely was born in Greenland during a transatlantic flight layover and grew up in Hitchin, a town near London. In the late 1980s, he became involved with the burgeoning acid house and rave scene in the UK. With collaborator Gavin Mills, the duo produced a number of house tracks in the early 1990s under the names Psychotropic, Freefall and Airtight and enjoyed some chart success. Following years of negotiations, a compilation of Nicely's two singles and unreleased tracks recorded between 1978 and 2004, titled Psychotropia, was released in 2004. Since then, he has released five albums of new material: Lysergia (2011), Space of a Second (2014), Sleep Safari (2017). Secret Life of Chance (2022), Afterworld 2023

== Early life ==
Nickolas Laurien was born in 1959 in Greenland on a stopover during a transatlantic flight by his parents, but he grew up firstly in Hitchin in Hertfordshire, and then later went on to live in Brockley, a Victorian conservation area in south London which has left a profound mark on his musical output. He claimed that his musical alias was created in 1973 "when one mate said 'give us a fag you sod', and another said 'why don't you ask Nick nicely?'" Laurien grew up listening to his parents' classical music collection and to 1960s pop records on the radio, but after hearing the song "Tracy" by the Cuff Links in 1969, he began to move away from pop music and listen to more experimental and psychedelic records. Laurien's first instrument was the harmonica, which he learnt to play at the age of ten, and later on he learnt the guitar.

== Early 1980s singles ==
=== "D.C.T. Dreams" ===
In the mid-1970s Laurien formed the Nick Nicely Band with some friends, playing mostly rock and acoustic numbers. However, the band was never a serious project, and when the other members gave up making music, Laurien was left with their recording equipment and began to write and record his own songs with it. Showcasing his demo tapes to various companies, he was signed by the Heath Levy publishing group who wanted to use some of his songs for other artists. As part of his deal, Laurien was given free time in a recording studio, which he used to record his first single, "D.C.T. Dreams", with the help of a friend, Jeff Leach. Speaking about Leach, Laurien said, "He was a key part of that single. He was a classically-trained keyboardist and it was with him that I started to do this abstract stuff when I returned from a visit to America in early 1980." Leach later became a sought-after session musician, playing keyboards for Barclay James Harvest, Brian May and Russell Watson among others, as well as being involved in the musical bands for the stage shows We Will Rock You and Strictly Come Dancing.

The A-side "D.C.T. Dreams" is a blend of equal parts 1980s electronics and 1960s psychedelia, whereas the B-side "Treeline" is more inclined towards psychedelia. The single was originally released on Laurien's own Voxette label (which he set up using the proceeds from the sale of his studio equipment), but after receiving airplay and some favourable reviews, it was picked up by the Hansa label and reissued late in 1980. The single became a minor hit in France and the Netherlands. "D.C.T. Dreams" was originally intended to be included on the Some Bizzare Album sampler of bands associated with the Some Bizzare record label's style, but was left off at the last minute when Some Bizzare's boss Stevo realised it had become a minor hit in Europe and was still readily available. However, by the time the single was re-released, interest and airplay support had fallen and the song failed to make the UK charts.

=== "Hilly Fields (1892)" ===
"Hilly Fields (1892)"
Excerpt of the song.

Nicely began recording the follow-up, "Hilly Fields (1892)", in December 1980, but the recording process was slow and laborious, and Nicely had to sell his personal possessions to pay for the studio time. Recording of the song took six months to complete, followed by another month of production work before Nicely was happy with the results. Hearing the early demo of the song, Hansa turned down the opportunity to release it, but an A&R man at EMI was more enthusiastic and signed Nicely to the label.

"Hilly Fields" was recorded at Heath Levy's own small studio and at Alvic Studios in west London, and again featured Jeff Leach on keyboards, along with Ian Pearce on drums, Rickman Godlee on cello, and "Kate" on additional vocals—for many years the rumour was that "Kate" was actually Kate Bush, but in 2010 Nicely explained that "I was always tied to Kate [Bush] with this rumor that she was on 'Hilly Fields'... Kate Jackson did vocals on 'D.C.T. Dreams'—I didn't know that was her surname, I wasn't sure. So on 'Hilly Fields' I used the same bit of tape of her singing and I just put 'Kate' because I didn't know her name. She's in the credits. And the rumor just got out of hand and I've always denied it but it still carries on a little bit because [Bush] did live around the corner and she was on EMI."

The track features a prominent 1960s psychedelic influence, cello playing, the 1980s synth-pop sound, and what is believed to be the first ever example of scratching on a non-hip hop recording, although the "scratching" was actually created by moving two tape spools back and forth, rather than on a turntable. It was named after Hilly Fields park in Brockley, south-east London, close to where Nicely lived. "Hilly Fields" was released in January 1982, and is regarded by many as Nicely's masterpiece. On its release it was made Single of the Week in the NME and described as "the best psychedelic record made since the '60s". In spite of, or due to, its obscurity it is considered in some circles to be "legendary".

The B-side was originally going to be a song called "6B Obergine", but three days before the single was due to be cut it was replaced by the typically 1960s-psych-inspired "49 Cigars", which was recorded and mixed in just two days. Despite favourable reviews in the music press, the single was not well promoted by EMI (Nicely believed that this was due in part to bad feeling between the label and his manager at the time), and as a result the song had almost no distribution or airplay, and failed to make an impression on the charts.

=== "On the Coast" ===
Despite "Hilly Fields" lack of chart success, EMI were keen to release the proposed follow-up single, "On the Coast". "Hilly Fields" had also attracted the attention of Trevor Horn, who approached Nicely with a view to producing his next songs, but Nicely turned him down, saying, "I knew that he would have creative control... also I was intimidated about going into Trevor Horn's studio and doing the singing and working with a guy who was having that sort of success. But I just made 'Hilly Fields' and I really liked the sound of 'Hilly Fields' and I suppose I didn't think I needed the help. But having said that, we had a lot of conversations and he said to me, 'I think you want to control it and you want to do your stuff'. So then they pulled out."

As with "Hilly Fields", "On the Coast" was also recorded at Heath Levy and at Alvic. However, the single was never released, due to Nicely's dissatisfaction with the song. In an interview with the L.A. Record in 2010 Nicely confirmed that the decision to block the song's release was his, saying "that's my fault. EMI did say to me, 'What do you want to do with this?' And looking back on it, I think probably what went wrong was that the drums were not dancey enough. But I said to EMI, 'No, don't bring it out.' And I stopped it... it was me in the end that stopped that record from coming out and that might have been a mistake."

== 1980s–1990s ==
After the failure to release "On the Coast", EMI dropped their interest in Nicely. With no equipment and no money to finance further recordings, and disillusioned with his experience of working with a major record label, Nicely retreated from the music business and faded into obscurity, spending the following two decades working on his songs away from the spotlight. His only appearance on record during the rest of the 1980s was contributing backing vocals to three tracks on the 1987 album A Cabinet of Curiosities by English singer-songwriter Paul Roland.

In the late 1980s he became involved with the burgeoning acid house and rave scene in the UK, and together with his friend Gavin Mills (aka "DJ Face") the duo produced a number of house tracks in the early 1990s under the names Psychotropic, Freefall and Airtight. The pair also collaborated with Jack Smooth on a single under the group name Citizen Kaned. Nicely recalled his involvement in that period: "we went right through acid house, the parties, '89, the whole scene—and it was a time that I enjoyed my greatest commercial success in the top of the dance charts. So it was definitely something that informs my work and yes, it was a fascinating period to be in the middle of that huge movement, when people really did think that the song had died and it was all going to be the emotions coming off the sound from mainly linear dance records, though a lot of them weren't of course. But yeah, fascinating time." Mills is now part of the DJ and production duo Copyright.

== 2000s–present ==
Nicely's work has been credited with inspiring several modern-day artists, most notably XTC's psychedelic offshoot band The Dukes of Stratosphear as well as the Bevis Frond, Robyn Hitchcock and Robert Wyatt.

Following years of negotiations, a compilation of his two singles and unreleased tracks recorded between 1978 and 2004, titled Psychotropia, was finally released in 2004 as an LP on Tenth Planet Records. The following year it was re-released by Sanctuary in CD format with six extra tracks, but following the label's demise in 2007 the CD was deleted. It was reissued with new artwork on Grapefruit (a subsidiary of Cherry Red Records) in 2010, containing a further extra track, "Marlon".

Several nick nicely songs have appeared on various compilations: "On the Beach (The Ladder Descends)" was included on the German mix album Permanent Vacation 2 in 2007, "49 Cigars" was featured on the album A Monstrous Psychedelic Bubble Exploding in Your Mind: Volume 1 compiled by Amorphous Androgynous in 2008, and the same year "London South" was included on Terrascope Audio Entertainment – Volume 2, only available from Terrascope Online. The UK newspaper The Guardian added "Hilly Fields" to their July 2010 playlist of favourite tunes.

On 11 October 2008 Nicely played his first ever live show, supporting friends and long-time supporters the Bevis Frond at the Luminaire in London. Since then Nicely has performed a handful of concerts (often under the band name nick nicely's Unlived Lives), including the Green Man Festival in 2009, and, inspired by the surrealists, always wearing a veil. In 2012 Nicely was invited to play two shows by Kasper and Herlinde Raeman, at Meneer Malasch (Amsterdam) and Wastelands Festival (Ghent). This marked the start of Nicely's solo performances. Sharing the bill were John Maus, Maria Minerva and Picture Plane. In November 2012 Nicely supported Ariel Pink in Hamburg.

In 2010 Nicely announced that he was working on an album of new material, with the working title of Space of a Second. In June 2011, the album, now titled Lysergia, was released on cassette (now sold out) by Burger Records.

In November 2011, the US record label Captured Tracks issued a compilation of Nicely's early recordings on vinyl, titled Elegant Daze: 1979–1986.

To mark the song's 30th anniversary, in June 2012 Fruits de Mer Records released a limited 7" vinyl single (now sold out) of a new version of "Hilly Fields", subtitled "The Mourning", with the original version on the B-side.

Nicely also collaborated with the band Unkle on a track titled "Puppeteers", recorded in 2009 during sessions for Unkle's Where Did the Night Fall album. A demo version of the song surfaced on the internet in April 2011 but to date it has not been officially released.

In September 2014, Lo Records released Nicely's second full-length album, Space of a Second. A third Nick Nicely album, Sleep Safari, was released on 26 September 2017 through Tapete Records. In 2018, "Hilly Fields" appeared in the Timothee Chalamont film Hot Summer Nights.

From the start of 2018 Nicely has been working on live performances accompanied by the musician Bug Lover and generating new versions of old tracks and adding visuals. First came secret gigs in Frappant (February and April) in Hamburg, then on 14 June 2018 at the Electric Ballroom in London supporting John Maus, followed by a December show in Moscow and then a US East coast tour again with Maus in 2019.

== Discography ==
Studio albums

- Psychotropia (Tenth Planet, 2003 vinyl LP only – reissued on Sanctuary in 2004 as CD with six extra tracks, and on Grapefruit in 2010 as CD reissue with one further extra track, "Marlon")
- Lysergia (Burger Records, 2011 cassette only)
- Elegant Daze (Captured Tracks, 2011 vinyl only)
- Space of a Second (Lo Records, 2014)
- Sleep Safari (Tapete Records, 2017)
- Secret Life of Chance (The State51 Conspiracy, 2022)
- Afterworld (Fruits de Mer Records 2023 vinyl only)

EPs

- 49 Cigars (Fruits de Mer Records, 2015 vinyl only)

Compilation albums

- Elegant Daze: 1979–1986 (Captured Tracks, 2011 – US release, vinyl LP or MP3 download only, compilation of Nick Nicely tracks with slightly different track listing from Psychotropia

Singles

- "D.C.T. Dreams" (b/w "Treeline") – originally released on Voxette (VOX 1001, September 1980); reissued on Hansa (UK catalogue number AHA 569, November 1980)
- "Hilly Fields (1892)" (b/w "49 Cigars") – EMI (UK catalogue number EMI 5256, January 1982)
- "Hilly Fields (1892) – The Mourning" (b/w "Hilly Fields (1892)" [original version]) – Limited edition of 800 copies vinyl only on Fruits de Mer Records (Volume 27, June 2012)
- "Wrottersley Road" 12-inch with three remixes (Emotional Response Records, 2013)
- "HeadwindAheadwind" with Secret Curtain remix (Lo Recordings, 2014)
- "Rainbow" with Vuuwerk remix (Lo Recordings, 2015)
- "London South" with remixes by Grasscut and Abul Mogard (Lo Recordings, 2015)
- "Ghostdream"/"The Otherside 2" with Boars (Tapete, 2017)
- "Solar Wind" (Tapete, 2017)
- "All Along the Watchtower"/"Doors of Perception" (Fruits de Mer Records, 2018, vinyl only release)
- "On the Beach (St Peters)"/"Lives Unlived" featuring Jesse Gallagher (2021, digital only release)
- "Butterflyy Mind"/"Waving Ghosts" (2021, digital only release)
- "Sundown26"/"Encased" (2021, digital only release)
- "Otherside 3" (2022 digital only release)
- "Rosemarys Eyes" (2023 digital only release)
- "Mike Hall Is Calling"/"Wonderful Day"(2023 digital release)
- "Mike Hall Is Calling"/"Wonderful Day"(June 2024 vinyl single)
- "Miniature Man" (Aug 2024 digital only)
- "Dreaming Alone" (June 2026 digital only)

As featured artist

- This Side Up (Ptolemaic Terrascope, 2004 – track: "Psychotropian Dobbscape", credited to Nick Nicely's X-Ray Orchestra)
- Permanent Vacation 2 (Permanent Vacation, 2007 – track: "On the Beach")
- A Monstrous Psychedelic Bubble Vol 1 – Cosmic Space Music (Platipus, 2008 – track: "49 Cigars")
- Deptford Days (Deep River Records, 2012 – track: "Hilly Fields" acoustic)
- The League of Psychedelic Gentlemen EP (Fruits de Mer Records, 2012 – track: "Rosemary's Eyes")
- Scared to Get Happy (Cherry Red Records, 2013 – track: "49 Cigars")
