= U.S. Christmas =

Rock Band from: Marion, North Carolina (2002)

- Origin: Marion, North Carolina, United States
- Genres: Psychedelic rock, sludge metal, folk
- Years active: 2002–present
- Labels: R.A.I.G; Neurot Recordings
- Members: Nate Hall; Michael Corwin; Graham Scala; Tony Plichta

U.S. Christmas is a psychedelic rock band from Marion, North Carolina, founded in 2002. After Neurosis guitarist/vocalist Scott Kelly heard their debut album Salt The Wound, he signed the band to Neurot Recordings, the label he owns with fellow Neurosis members. Their sound features elements of Americana, sludge metal, traditional Appalachian music, psychedelic rock, space rock and folk. The band is now based out of Marshall, North Carolina.

The first two albums focused on the repetition of distorted riffs - many of the songs off Eat The Low Dogs feature only a handful of them. The follow-up, Run Thick In The Night had a broader sonic palette, with violinist Megham Mulhearn added to the band, along with Hall using more clean singing. The record was produced by Sanford Parker of Minsk, while the artwork was created by renowned artist Jeremy Clark, a.k.a. Hush. The follow-up to this record was a 40-minute single-song album, The Valley Path, which received critical acclaim and was chosen as the Album of the Day on Roadburn's website. They have supported the likes of Yob and Neurosis.

Eat of The Low Dogs was heavily influenced by the book Blood Meridian by Cormac McCarthy., and for the last two albums Hall says that he has "been inspired a lot by the natural world. I live right in the middle of a national forest and that's where I get a lot of my inspiration. When you live in a place like that, you sort of feel it. I'm pretty connected to this place. My family has been here for a long time. It's a real inspiring place".

Singer/guitarist Nate Hall, also released a solo album in 2012 entitled A Great River. His vocals range from a hoarse scream to clean singing. Bassist Josh Holt and drummer Billy Graves are also founding and current members of Translation Loss "punk/sludge metal" band Generation of Vipers. Graves is also the drummer for Neurot label mates A Storm of Light, of which Holt has also performed with as a touring guitarist. Violinist Meghan Mullhearn also performs as a solo artist under the moniker Divine Circles in addition to having her hands in many other experimental music projects.

The band is now extremely active in the studio and in 2025 released the five track album Cannibals of Unaka on their own Eternal Clarity record label. A follow up, The Dark and Narrow is set for release in 2026.

== Discography ==
=== Studio albums ===
- Bad Heart Bull (2004, Play The Assassin Records)
- Salt the Wound (2006, R.A.I.G)
- Eat The Low Dogs (2008, Neurot Recordings)
- Run Thick In The Night (2010, Neurot Recordings)
- The Valley Path (2011, Neurot Recordings)
- Cannibals of Unaka (2025, Eternal Clarity)

=== Splits ===
- Split with Harvestman and Minsk, Hawkwind Triad (2010, Neurot Recordings)
- Split with Scott Kelly Three Baron Eye / The Traveling Sun (7") (2013, Domestic Genocide Records)
- Split with The Grand Astoria (12" 2013, Setalight Records)
