= Cary Grace =

American singer-songwriter

Cary Grace is an American recording artist, singer, songwriter, musician, and record producer. She plays guitar and analogue synthesizers.

Her music is strongly influenced by classic British psychedelic and progressive rock as well as space rock, but spans a wide range of genres, from folk rock to slow cosmic blues, to heavier guitar rock. It can at times be reminiscent of early 1970s Pink Floyd. Some of her music has been compared sonically to Hawkwind and other space rock groups, because of the use of electronic instruments. Her writing places much emphasis on meaningful, intellectual lyrics, in addition to creating interesting atmosphere and sonic textures, and showcasing musicianship through extended improvised jams.

She produces her own music, working with various band line-ups and collaborators, and focuses on presenting each of her albums as a complete art form. She is known for her use of unusual production elements, homemade instruments, vintage synthesizers, including the EMS VCS 3, and analogue tape effects.

In 2004, Cary released her first album, consisting mainly of singer-songwriter, acoustic, folk-rock, and Americana material. It was recorded in Nashville with local musicians, and Vince Gill made a guest appearance, playing mandolin on two tracks.

She moved to the United Kingdom in 2005, to pursue a different musical direction. Since the move she has released a couple of full-length albums and one EP. She has appeared on over a dozen releases by Fruits de Mer Records.

== Discography ==
- Book of Rhymes (2004)
- Pandora (Single) (2007)
- Where You Go (2007)
- Mendip Rock (EP) (2008)
- Projections (2008)
- Perpetual Motion (2009)
- Tygerland (2015)
- The Ufculme Variations Live at Kozfest (2016)
- Covers Volume I (2018)
- Lady of Turquoise (2020)
