= Sendelica =

- Origin: Wales
- Genres: experimental rock, progressive rock, psychedelic rock, space rock, ambient
- Years active: 2006 - present
- Labels: FRG Records, RAIG Records, TidyLike Records, Fruits de Mer Records, Vincebus Eruptum Records, Sunhair Records, Harmacy Records.
- Past members: Sarah E, Colin Consterdine, Paul Fields, Geoff Chase, Ed "Vizzie" Guild, Nick Danger, Dennis Antonov, Kamille Sharapodinov, Jim Barber, Lord Armstrong Of Sealand, Meurig Griffiths, Joe Caswell, Neil Charlie Spragg.
- Website: Sendelica at Bandcamp

Sendelica were a psychedelic rock trio from West Wales composed of core members Pete Bingham (guitars and electronics) until his untimely passing in 2026, Glenda Pescado (bass guitar) and Jack Jackson (drums). The band have regularly collaborated with many musicians, noticeably Lee Relfe (saxophone) and Colin Consterdine (keyboards/production) as well as artists, film makers and performance artists and, although primarily an instrumental group, with a number of vocalists as well.

Sendelica conspicuously wore their influences on their sleeves and their music has been described as blending "the hypnotic pulse of Can, the impressionistic atmospherics of Pink Floyd, the motorized proto-punk of Neu, the space patrolling guitar pyrotechnics of Jimi Hendrix and the otherworldly ambiences of The Orb." They are also known for drawing inspiration from the local landscapes of Cardigan Bay and the Preseli Mountains and the rich, ancient heritage of the region.

The group’s first EP, TheOwlsHaveEyes, was released in July 2006 on their own FRG Records, with additional vocals by Chris Gibbs and keyboards by Roger Morgan. Over the following years they have prolifically released CD, vinyl and, more recently, cassette albums on various record labels.

As well as their many studio releases the band also toured regularly and have produced several live albums.

== Discography ==
=== Studio albums ===
- Entering The Rainbow Light (2006, FRG Records; very limited edition CD)
  - Anniversary CD reissue (2016, FRG Records)
- Sleepwalker Fever (2007, TidyLike Records CD)
  - CD, vinyl and "Picture Disc" reissue (2017, FRG Records)
  - Cassette edition (2017, Harmacy Records)
- Spaceman Bubblegum And Other Weird Tales From The Mercury Mind (January 2007, RAIG Records CD)
  - Reissued as The Cosmonaut Years Vol 1 (2019, FRG Records Vinyl & CD)
- The Alternative Realities Of The Re-Awakening Somnambulist (2008, TidyLike Records CD)
  - CD, vinyl and "Picture Disc" reissue (2023, FRG Records)
- The Girl From The Future Who Lit Up The Sky With Golden Worlds (2009, RAIG Records CD)
  - Reissued as The Cosmonaut Years Vol 2 (2019, FRG Records Vinyl & CD)
- Transatlantic Underground (2009, TidyLike Records CD)
  - CD and vinyl reissue (2021, FRG Records)
- Streamedelica She Sighed As She Hit Rewind On The Dream Mangler Remote (2010, RAIG Records CD)
  - Reissued as The Cosmonaut Years Vol 3 (2019, FRG Records Vinyl & CD)
- The Pavilion Of Magic And The Trials Of The Seven Surviving Elohim (2011, FRG Records CD)
  - CD and vinyl reissue (2016, Sunhair Records)
  - Cassette edition (2016, Harmacy Records)
- The Satori In Elegance Of The Majestic Stonegazer (11 June 2012, FRG Records CD)
  - Vinyl issue (15 March 2013, Vincebus Eruptum Records)
  - Vinyl reissue (2016, Vincebus Eruptum Records)
- Strangefishone (with Craig Padilla) (25 April 2013 limited edition split vinyl 12" on Fruits de Mer)
- The Kaleidoscopic Kat And It's Autoscopic Ego (14 July 2013, FRG Records CD)
  - Vinyl issue (6 September 2013, Vincebus Eruptum Records)
  - Vinyl reissue (2016, Vincebus Eruptum Records)
- The Megaliths Vol 1 and Vol 2 (November 2013, FRG Records 2x CD limited edition [200 copies] and very limited edition box set [25 copies])
- Anima Mundi (2015, FRG Records Vinyl/CD)
- Psychedelic Battles Volume 1 - Sendelica vs Da Captain Trips (2015, Vincebus Eruptum Records split vinyl issue/ FRG Records split CD issue)
- I Feel Love - Sidesteps (with Julie's Haircut) (2015, Fruits De Mer split vinyl 12" issued as part of "Side Effects" box set)
- I'll Walk With The Stars For You (2016, Vincebus Eruptum Records Vinyl/ FRG Records CD)
- The Cromlech Chronicles (May 2016, Fruits De Mer Vinyl/ FRG Records CD)
- Lilacs Out Of The Deadlands (April 2017, Sunhair Records Vinyl/CD)
- The Cromlech Chronicles II (December 2017, Fruits De Mer Vinyl/ FRG Records CD)
- My House Is Made Of Angel Hair (April 2018, Vincebus Eruptum Records Vinyl/ FRG Records CD)
- The Cromlech Chronicles III (July 2018, Fruits De Mer Vinyl/ FRG Records CD)
- Cromlech Re-Imagined Vol 1 (August 2018, FRG Records Vinyl/CD)
- The Cromlech Chronicles IV: The Door Into Summer (July 2019, Fruits De Mer Vinyl/ FRG Records CD)
- The Cosmonaut Years Vol 1-3 (October 2019, FRG Records Vinyl & CD Reissue)
- And Man Created God (August 2021, Fruits De Mer Vinyl/ FRG Records CD/USB)
- One Man's Man ... (November 2022, Fruits De Mer Vinyl/ FRG Records CD/USB)
- Man, Myth & Magic (December 2023, Fruits De Mer Vinyl/ FRG Records CD/USB)
- Requiem For Mankind (December 2024, Fruits De Mer Vinyl/ FRG Records CD/USB)
- Nirmata (August 2025, Friends Of The Fish Vinyl/ FRG Records CD/USB)
- Nirmata II - Journey To The Stars (October 2026, Friends Of The Fish Vinyl/FRG Records CD)

=== Compilations ===
- The Fabled Voyages Of The Sendelicans (2014, Vincebus Eruptum Records Vinyl/ FRG Records CD)
- The Fruits De Mer Covers (2019, FRG Records CD)
  - Reissued (2023, FRG Records Limited [30] Special '19th Dream' Lathe-cut Picture Disc)
- The Complete Cromlech Chronicles (2020, Fruits De Mer Records 6xCD Box Set)
- The Complete Mankind (2025, Fruits De Mer 8CD Box Set)
- An Introduction To Sendelica (2026, Fruits De Mer 4CD Box Set)

=== EPs ===
- TheOwlsHaveEyes (July 2006, FRG Records CD)
- Live In London (2013, Split 7" Fruits De Mer Club Members Only)
- 12 Shades (2016, Friends Of The Fish one sided 12" Vinyl)
- Disco Daze (January 2018, FRG Records CD and very limited [10 only] one sided lathe-cut 12" picture disc vinyl)
- Windmill (July 2019, Fruits De Mer 12" Vinyl/ FRG Records CD)

=== Singles ===
- A Nice Pear (2010, Fruits de Mer 7" Vinyl), featuring "Venus in Furs" and "Maggot Brain"
- Hard Coming Love / Love Song For The Dead Che (2014, Fruits De Mer 7" Vinyl)
- Ziggy Stardust (2016, Fruits De Mer 7" Vinyl)
- Nite Flights (2016, Fruits De Mer 7" Vinyl)
- Zappa (with Superfjord) (2017, Fruits De Mer Split 7" Vinyl)
- Return Of The Maggot Brains (2018, RSD release, FRG Records limited [40] 8" vinyl and very limited [10] 7" picture disc Vinyl)
- Seren (with Elfin Bow) (2020, Fruits De Mer, Limited [85] 7" Lathe-cut Vinyl)

=== Live albums ===
- Live at Knitting Factory, New York 2008 (2008, No Label CD)
- Strangers In A Strange Land (2011, No Label CD)
- Live At Kozfest, July 2012 (2012, No Label CD)
- Live At Crabstock (2014, Friends Of The Fish Records Vinyl/CD)
- Sendelica Acoustica - Live At '13th Dream Of Dr. Sardonicus' (2015, Friends Of The Fish Records 10" Vinyl/CD mini album)
- Live From The 7th Psychedelic Network Festival (2015, Sunhair Records Vinyl/CD)
- Live At Immerhin (2016, Sunhair Records Vinyl/CD)
- 10th Anniversary Tour 2016 (2016, Friends Of The Fish Records 2x CD and Bonus DVD)
- Live At The 14th Dream Festival - Sendelica Drone Band (2017, Friends Of The Fish Vinyl/ FRG Records CD)
- Live In Berlin (2017, FRG Records CD)
- Live At Blind Cat Festival 2017 (2018, FRG Records CD)
- Outer Space To Inner Space - The 2018 Live Journeys (2018, FRG Records CD/DVD)
- Live Bootleg Volume One (2021, Friends Of The Fish Double CD)
- Live Bootleg Volume Two (2022, Friends Of The Fish Double CD)
- Live Bootleg Volume Three (2022, Friends Of The Fish Double CD)
- Live Bootleg Volume Four (2022, Friends Of The Fish Double CD)
- Live Bootleg Volume Five (2023, Friends Of The Fish Double CD)
- Live Bootleg Volume Six (2023, Friends Of The Fish Double CD)
- Live At The 19th Dream Of Dr. Sardonicus Festival 2023 (2023, FRG Records CD)
- Live At The 20th Dream Of Dr. Sardonicus Festival 2024 (2024, FRG Records CD)
- Live At The Cellar 2nd August 2025 (2025, FRG Records Vinyl/ The Cellar Tapes CD)

=== Side projects ===
The Fellowship Of Hallucinatory Voyagers

- This Is No Wilderness (2017, FRG Records Vinyl/CD)
- Tenderness Avalanche (2019, FRG Records Vinyl/CD)
- Live At 16th Dream Of Dr. Sardonicus Festival 2018 (2019, Friends Of The Fish Records Vinyl/CD)
- Infinitely Finite (2020, FRG Records Vinyl/CD)
- The Imaginary Gallery (2021, FRG Records Vinyl/CD)
- The Imaginary Gallery II (2022, FRG Records Vinyl/CD)
- ... And That Is The End Of The Poem (2022, FRG Records Vinyl/CD)
- Extraordinarily Ordinary (2024, FRG Records Vinyl/CD)

A.B.B.A

- Temple Of Love / Bela Lugosi's Dead (2018, FRG Records Limited [48] Lathe-cut 7" Vinyl)
- Human Fly / Babylon's Burning (2019, FRG Records Limited [50] Lathe-cut 7" Vinyl)
- All Tomorrows Parties (2020, FRG Records Limited [50] Lathe-cut 7" vinyl)

The Lost Stoned Pandas

- Pandamonium EP (2019, FRG Records CD & T-Shirt Box set and Limited [50] One-sided Lathe-cut 12" Vinyl)
- Tune In ... Turn On ... Get Panda'd (April 2020, Fruits De Mer Records Vinyl/ FRG Records CD)
- Glory (April 2020, FRG Records Limited Lathe-cut 7" Vinyl)
- Pandademic (October 2020, FRG Records Vinyl/CD)
- Dark Side Of The Noom (2021, FRG Records Vinyl/CD)
- Live At Mwnci (2022, FRG Records Limited Edition 12" Lathe-cut)
- Dark Side Of The Noom II (2022, FRG Records Vinyl/CD)
- On The Edge Of Consciousness (2024, FRG Records Vinyl/CD/USB)

Band Of Cloud

- A For Andromeda (2023, FRG Records Vinyl/CD/USB/Limited [23] Lathe-cut Picture Disc)

Electronic Meditation

- Electronic Meditation (2025, FRG Records Vinyl and Limited Edition CD/USB)
