= Lotuspike =

Independent progressive ambient music record

Lotuspike is an independent progressive ambient music record label based in Pittsburgh, Pennsylvania United States. The label was started in 2004 by Ben Cox, Jeff Kowal (who records as Terra Ambient) and Daniel Pipitone. In 2006 Jeff Kowal relocated to Albuquerque, New Mexico but continues activities with the label.

Lotuspike gained rapid respect within the ambient electronic music genre by releasing a small focused catalog of high-quality releases while maintaining fair and equitable terms for musicians releasing music on the label, and quickly attracted interest from a number of established musicians in the genre.

Lotuspike has released albums by founders Kowal and Cox, and established veterans Darshan Ambient, Chad Hoefler, Rudy Adrian, Craig Padilla and Zero Ohms, and Markus Reuter.

In 2008, Lotuspike joined forces with the Spotted Peccary Music label, allowing Lotuspike's releases to be more widely distributed, marketed, and heard.

== See also ==
- List of record labels
- List of electronic music record labels
