= Rob Clarke (musician) =

- Born: Liverpool, England
- Genres: Rock, folk rock, country rock, experimental rock, psychedelic rock
- Occupations: Musician, singer-songwriter, director, screenwriter
- Instruments: Guitar, vocals, harmonica, piano, organ, banjo, ukulele
- Labels: Kool Kat Musik, Staff Only Records, Indisc, Blue Train, Fruits de Mer
- Website: robclarkemusic.com

Rob Clarke is a British singer-songwriter. Described by AltSounds as 'more than just a man and a guitar' he is influenced by a range of genres including folk music, country music and psychedelic rock as well as formative experiences growing up in Liverpool, Nottingham, Huddersfield, Skipton and Aberdeen.

== Early years ==
Clarke began in music in NE Scotland to which his family had finally moved after various spells in Liverpool, Nottingham, Huddersfield and Skipton, when his father was engaged as the Director of Robert Gordon University. Initially this was 'closing down the old Scottish Highland dance halls' but heading south he later had a London record deal with Blue Train Records whilst living in Muswell Hill and struggling to break into the late 80s music London scene.

This time included some live and sound recording with amongst others The Truth, The Pretenders Don't Get Me Wrong, Fischer Z and Peter Hammill, whilst playing piano with Jonathon Perkins (Original Mirrors), bass with Steve Skolnick (Fischer Z) and recording a solo single with Brand X producer and keyboardist Robin Lumley. This was released to only moderate success on Blue Train and Indisc in Europe.

At this point he met Paul Reynolds (musician) and Frank Maudsley from A Flock of Seagulls who shared the same management and soon he returned to his Liverpool birthplace with them to sing and write the material in a new band Almighty Atmosphere, until the project finished after a subsequent management change and split.

== Later solo albums ==
Since he has released a series of introspective solo acoustic albums Long Way North (2008), Portraits (2010) and About A Time (2013) until the 2014 Fender Telecaster group based psychedelic garage rock of The World of The Wooltones. All these recordings were released on Staff Only Records with 'less is more' producer Fran Ashcroft at the controls.

Of these, first album Long Way North was described by the Liverpool Echo as 'simple songs sung simply with a melodious voice... No flim flam, no camouflage, no recording studio tricks, just the music and the voice – doing what so many recording artists are too cowardly to do for fear of showing their vulnerabilities. This album rather shows Rob Clarke's strengths, his warm voice and sensitive musicality, coupled with memorable songs that somehow evoke the spirit of Liverpool, and will touch the heart of many, particularly the title track'.

Second album Portraits he described as being about 'an artist, two footballers and a hedgehog' and contained paeans to Alan Ball, Jr, George Best, Tracey Emin and Johnny Cash and a hedgehog called Spike.

Third album About a Time (2013) contained 'Millican's Green' about the alternative lifestyle of Millican Dalton and was the subject of a BBC Radio Merseyside Folkscene special in which Clarke's song writing motivation and process was explored.

== Groups ==
=== Rob Clarke and the Wooltones ===
Clarke's recent work with the Wooltones displays a rougher electric edge, once described by Spencer Leigh (BBC Radio Merseyside), as 'Sounds as if you are all spaced and stretched out on the floor' and by Liverpool Gigs as 'Their songs give me traumatic sixties flashbacks and I wasn't even alive then!' Whereas Mark Barton in Godisinthetvzine noted The World of The Wooltones album was 'Laced and button braced with a delectably primal bite'. The singles Are You Wooltoned?, The Wooltone Maxi and The Brown Single were also released with characterful promo campaigns in 2013/2014.

Rob Clarke and The Wooltones have also appeared on vinyl, CD and download compilations from Fruits de Mer Records, Winter Records, Active Listener, Psychedelic Underground Generation, Trip Inside This House and Pyschgaze, whilst receiving airplay in the UK, Europe and the US. The band performed a cover of "Atlantis" by Donovan and "Mind of a Child" by Clouds, included on the Fruits de Mer Records album A Phase We're Going Through. They later contributed an electric guitar cover, likened in style to that of The Bevis Frond, of the BBC The Sky at Night theme originally composed by Jean Sibelius to the Fruits de Mer Records release Do Not Adjust Your Set.

Later albums Are You Wooltoned? and Big Night Out released on New Jersey label Kool Kat Musik in the USA, cemented this line up's garage/ psychedelic/ Scouseadelic credentials. About the former, Power Pop news noted 'With guitars a plenty and melodies that stick with you after a single listen...there’s not a clunker in this baker’s dozen of songs'. Whilst reviewing the latter John Bottomley of Bucketfull of Brains considered Clarke to be 'undisputed leader of the modern Merseybeat mission'.

Big Night Out also included a bonus disk recorded live in 2017 at St Peter's Church, Woolton, Liverpool at the 60th anniversary celebration of when John Lennon met Paul McCartney, featuring original drummer Colin Hanton of The Quarrymen. Bucketfull of Brains commented 'noted Local lad Clarke and his Wooltones become The Quarrymen for a longish set of souped-up skiffle and early rock ‘n’ roll. Authenticity and approval are boosted by the presence of original Quarryman Colin Hanton as second drummer... Clarke’s vocals do the business on songs played that day which are delivered faithfully, rocking out and swinging with style. Someone needed to pull this together and Rob Clarke was always that man'.

More recently 2020's Putting The L in Wootones on the same label was included in the Goldmine (magazine) Top 50 Albums of the year noting 'Words cannot express how much fun this album is'.

=== Rob Clarke with the Brown Bears ===
In 2015 Clarke released an alt-country album titled 10 Country Greats and 1 Other which had been recorded at No.4 Studios with the Brown Bears. Clarke's work in this laid back country style was described by Mark Barton in The Sunday Experience as 'delicately drawn as a sweetly drifting country folk ramble etched in bitterness, pity and a sense of regret'

== Film ==
Clarke also finished work in 2014 on a 45-minute autobiographical film titled 'North to West' featured on BBC Radio Merseyside Billy Butler (DJ) and described as a 'Pilgrims Progress through music, life and Liverpool' featuring friends, musicians and media. This includes the 'Save Woolton Cinema' song written as part of a campaign to save the local Woolton Picture House when it came under threat of redevelopment. The film also includes extensive live performance footage shot in Liverpool venues such as The Zanzibar, familiar Liverpool streets and places including Bold Street and Woolton and a sequence based on the 1911 Liverpool general transport strike.

== Recent Work ==
Clarke travelled to Warner Bros Recording Studios Nashville in March 2015 to work with legendary USA producer Elliot Mazer known for his work with Neil Young, Linda Ronstadt and Bob Dylan amongst others. The sessions featured renowned Nashville musicians including David Briggs (American musician), Mac Gayden and Teddy Irwin. Two tracks were later released from these sessions, The Best Night and In My Dreams.

== Discography ==
- Long Way North (album) (2008)
- Portraits (album) (2010)
- About a Time (album) (2013)
- Are You Wooltoned?/ Colours of the Sun (single) (2013)
- The Wooltone Maxi (maxi single) (2013)
- The Brown Single (single) (2014)
- The World of The Wooltones (album) (2014)
- 10 Country Greats and 1 Other (album) (2015)
- The Best Night (single) (2016)
- In My Dreams (single) (2016)
- Are You Wooltoned? (album) (2016)
- Big Night Out (album) (2018)
- Bring Me Wooltones This Year! (ep) (2018)
- Putting The L in Wootones (album) (2020)
- Rubber Chicken B Sides (ep) (2022)
- Blues Beats and Brel (album) (2024)
- Opiope (album) 2026
