= Dead Bees records =

French record label

Dead Bees Records
- Founded: 2003
- Founder: Seb Wood; Seb Duclos
- Genre: Indie rock
- Country of origin: France
- Location: Toulouse
- Official website: Official website

Dead Bees Records is a French independent record label, with a roster of indie rock artists and bands.

== History ==
Dead Bees Records was started in 2003 by two Toulouse-based musicians, Seb Wood (from Call Me Loretta) and Seb Duclos (from the Nova Express, Fuck Buddies), under the terms of an unincorporated association.

The label was named after a quote from the Howard Hawks movie To Have and Have Not: "Was you ever bit by a dead bee?".

The label was initially intended to release the debut recordings by Call Me Loretta or the Nova Express, but soon expanded its scope by importing or promoting international acts. Dead Bees was the first French label to work with Bomp! Records, The Committee to Keep Music Evil and Celluloid Dreams to bring the Brian Jonestown Massacre to French audiences.

Dead Bees later added numerous French, U.S. and British artists to its roster, and has earned acclaim for the label's yearly record sampler, released through creative commons license.

Black Bees Records, the African division of Dead Bees Records, was created in 2014. The first release was Nigerian band Laïka's debut album.

== Roster ==
=== Current roster ===
- All in The Golden Afternoon
- Alone In 1982
- The Black Feathers
- Brian Coatsie
- Call Me Loretta
- The Chemistry Set
- Cotton Club
- D. Trevlon
- The Dalaï Lama Rama Fa Fa Fa
- Dan Alfresco
- Dead Horse One
- E Becomes I
- Fuck Buddies
- Haze Parade
- Helluvah
- Kingdom of the Holy Sun
- The Lovetones
- Moloko Velocet
- My Lovely Underground
- Recife
- Savage
- Sky Parade
- Sleep Talker
- Spindrift
- Sunsplit
- The Rusty Bells

=== Previous bands ===
- A Poplar
- The Arrogants
- Asteroid No.4
- The Black Angels
- Blitzen Trapper
- The Brian Jonestown Massacre
- The Clerks
- Cobson
- De neuve
- The December Sound
- Director's Cut
- Henri Joel
- Let's Go Sailing
- Moore:music
- The Nova Express
- The Quarter After
- Rick Bain
- Soltero
- Sounds in the Olive Grove
- The Temporary Thing

== See also ==
- List of record labels
