= Vanessa Hall-Smith =

Vanessa Frances Hall-Smith MBE (born April 1951) is an English lawyer, musician and writer. She was the director of the British Institute of Florence from 2004 to 2011.

== Biography ==
Hall-Smith was born in April 1951 and came from a family of doctors. She was educated at the Roedean School in Roedean near Brighton, East Sussex. After this, she lived in Italy where she attended the University of Perugia, worked as a restaurant photographer in Florence and became fluent in Italian. After graduating, Hall-Smith spent a year teaching English in Rome.

Hall-Smith later studied law at the University of Exeter and conducted postgraduate studies in Germany and France. At Exeter, Hall-Smith played viola and violin and recorded an album with the progressive rock and folk rock band Fuchsia, providing violin and backing vocals.

Hall-Smith passed the English bar exam in 1976, then practised as a barrister for a number of years and was secretary of the International Law Association in the 1980s. She later requalified as a solicitor and was a partner with the London firms The Simkins Partnership and Harrison Curtis, specialising in advertising rights. She spoke publicly on copyright issues; specifically on copyrighted media used in advertising and the associated risks for the advertisers and state regulation of the industry.

Hall-Smith was the director of the British Institute of Florence from 2004 to 2011. In 2008, Hall-Smith was appointed a Member of the Order of the British Empire "for services promoting UK culture in Italy."

Hall-Smith returned to England in 2011. In 2014, she wrote the foreword for the art history book Agnolo Bronzino: Medici Court Artist in Context by Andrea M. Gáldy. She co-edited Rivista, the Magazine of the British-Italian Society, with Linda Northern from 2014 to 2019. In 2024-2025, she served as Treasurer of the Islington Choral Society in Islington, North London.

== Personal life ==
Hall-Smith married lawyer Alper Riza, a half-Turkish and half-Greek Cypriot in 1981. They had two children and separated in the 1990s.
