= Rudy Adrian =

New Zealand ambient musician (born 1965)

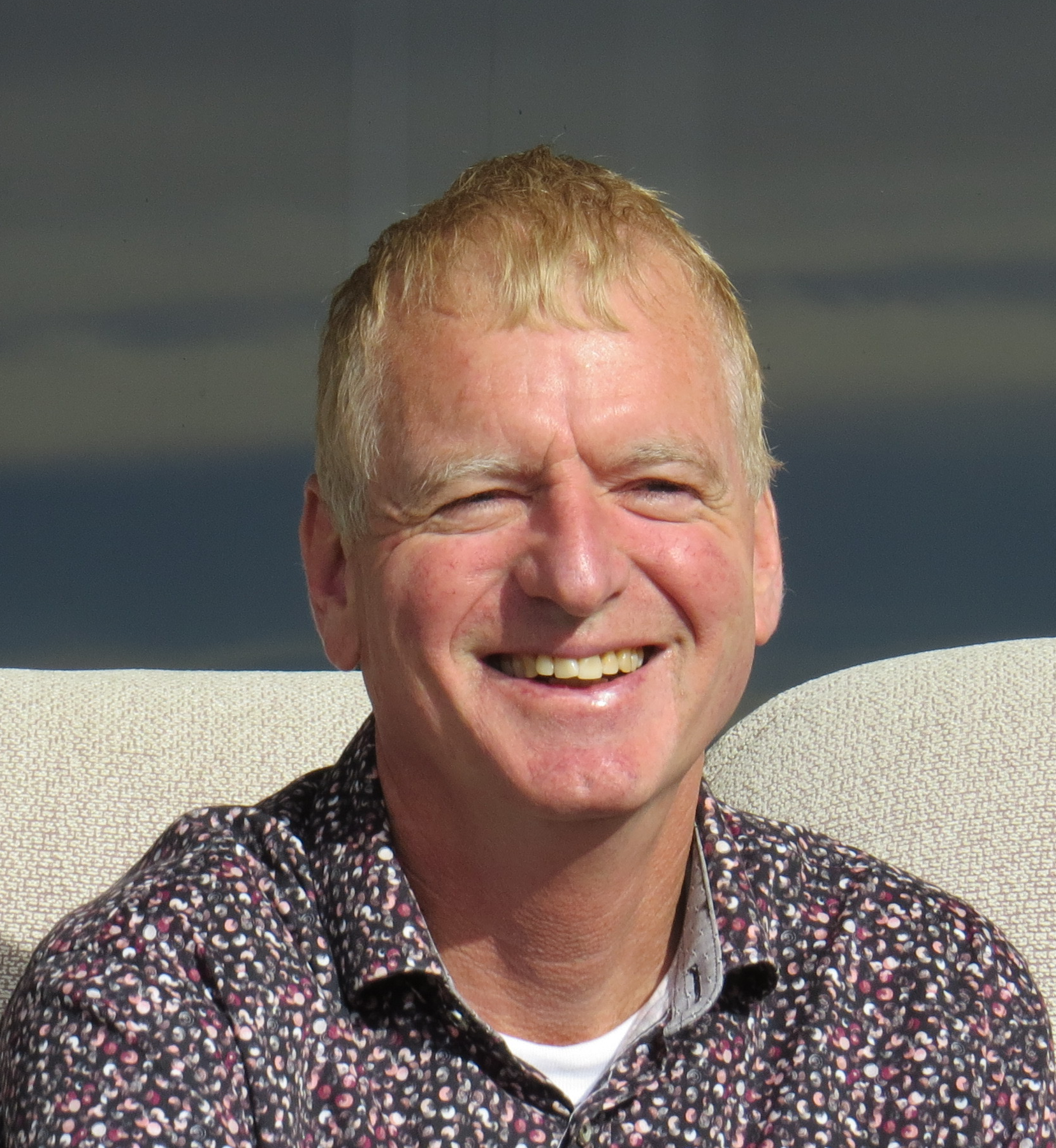
Adrian, photographed in Twizel, New Zealand, May 2024

Rudy Adrian (né Hueting; born 1965) is a New Zealand ambient musician from Dunedin.

== Music ==
Rudy worked as a freelance musician and sound effects creator for television programs, advertisements, and short films.

Working in styles ranging from beatless atmospheric music to heavily sequenced electronica, Adrian released several albums and produced soundtracks for television in his profession as a sound engineer for Taylormade Media. He is one of the hosts of a radio programme specialising in ambient music on the Dunedin campus radio station, Radio One.

Adrian's early albums form two distinct series: "Atmospheric Works" and "Sequencer Sketches". His first mini-album, SubAntarctica (initially released under his birth name of Rudy Hueting) was as part of a multi-media collaboration on art in the subantarctic. He and several other artists travelling to the Campbell and Auckland Islands produced music based on the experience. His albums have included collaborations with Nick Prosser, a flautist from New Zealand and Dutch keyboardist Ron Boots. Adrian has toured New Zealand and the United States, presenting works in a variety of venues ranging from concert halls to planetaria.

== Discography ==
- SubAntarctica – Atmospheric Works Vol. 1 (originally released 1992, re-released in extended form 1999)
- Twilight – Atmospheric Works Vol. 2 (1999)
- Kinetic Flow – Sequencer Sketches Vol. 1 (2000, Groove Unlimited Records)
- The Healing Lake (2000; White Cloud)
- Iridescence – Sequencer Sketches Vol. 2 (2001, Groove Unlimited)
- Concerts in New Zealand 2000–2001 (live, with Nick Prosser) Quantum Records
- Across the Silver River (with Ron Boots) 2002, Groove Unlimited
- Starfields – Sequencer Sketches Vol. 3 (2002, Groove Unlimited)
- Concerts in the USA (2003, Groove Unlimited)
- Moonwater (2006; Lotuspike)
- Par Avion – Sequencer Sketches Vol. 4 (2007, Groove Unlimited)
- Par Avion (Bonus CDr) (2007, not on label)
- Desert Realms (2008, Lotuspike)
- Desert Realms Out-Takes (CDr) 2008, not on label
- Distant Stars (2010, Lotuspike)
- Atmospheres (2014, Spotted Peccary Music)
- Coastlines (2016, Spotted Peccary)
- Sequencer Rarities (2017, Groove Unlimited)
- Woodlands (2019, Spotted Peccary)
- As Dusk Becomes Night (2021, Spotted Peccary)
- A Walk in the Shadow Garden (2023, Spotted Peccary)
- Reflections On A Moonlit Lake (2024, Spotted Peccary)
- Beyond the Sleepy Hills (2024, Spotted Peccary)

== See also ==
- List of ambient music artists
