= Fuchsia (band) =

British progressive folk rock band

- Origin: Exeter, England
- Genres: Progressive rock; folk rock
- Years active: 1970–present
- Labels: Pegasus, Night Wing Record, Fruits de Mer Records
- Past members: Michael Day, Michael Gregory, Janet Rogers, Madeleine Bland, Vanessa Hall-Smith
- Website: www.fuchsiamusic.com

Fuchsia is a British progressive folk rock band formed in 1970. Named after Fuchsia Groan they released one album before disbanding. Their album, Fuchsia, was listed as one of Mojo magazine's "Forgotten Classics". Their style was similar to their contemporaries Jade and Comus.

== Formation ==
The band was formed by Tony Durant (acoustic guitar, electric guitar, lead vocals) while a student at Exeter University with Michael Day (bass guitar), Michael Gregory (drums, percussion). The trio was soon augmented by Janet Rogers (violin, backing vocals), Madeleine Bland (cello, piano, harmonium, backing vocals) and Vanessa Hall-Smith (violin, backing vocals) so that Durant could explore his musical ideas.

Produced by David Hitchcock, their album was recorded at Sound Techniques Studios by Vic Gamm. It was released by Pegasus (PEG 8) in the UK and by Kingdom (KV 6002) in France. A single advertisement in the Melody Maker and their manager's failure to arrange an often promised tour resulted in minimal sales and the demise of the band. Durant went to work in Australia with Dave Warner and later learned of the popularity of the album amongst collectors and the unlicensed re-pressings. Using his original master tapes he digitally remastered the album at Sound Practices Studios in Sydney which was released on CD (Night Wing NWRCD 02).

== Recent activity ==
In 2005, the CD Fuchsia, Mahagonny & other gems (Night Wing NWRCD 04) was released. This contained three further Fuchsia tracks, two recorded while looking for a new record company after the first album, and the third an original demonstration acetate recording. Another eight tracks from other projects including Mahagonny, a theatre show based on the works of Bertoldt Brecht and Kurt Weill, completed the album.

In 2013, the CD album From Psychedelia... To a Distant Place (Sound Practices 001) was released under the name Fuchsia II with a new band assembled by Durant in Australia and comprising Durant himself (guitars and vocals), Lloyd Gyi (drums, percussion), Emily Duffill (cello), Tracy Wan (violin), Lidia Bara (violin) and Jo Bara (cello), with Suzy Toomey (accordion) and Isabel Durant (backing vocals). The album gained favourable reviews in the British music press The album contained mostly new material, although the track "The Rainbow Song" included a re-working of "Shoes and Ships" from the first album recorded forty-two years previously.

Also in 2013, the single "The Band" was released. This song was written for a second album that was never recorded before Fuchsia disbanded in the 1970s. In the 2013 release, "The Band" is performed by the Swedish band Me and My Kites (named after a song on Fuchsia's first album) with Durant on vocals.

In February 2017 Fuchsia finally got to play/perform Mahagonny-Behind Innocent Eyes, the music from the Fuchsia Mahagonny and Other Gems CD release from 2005. With a group of young actors the show, 40 years in the making, finally got to be played to a very enthusiastic audience at the Perth Fringe festival, Perth Western Australia

In August 2017, a Fuchsia line-up including Durant and Day began a short British tour in Cardigan, Wales, to coincide with the release of the Song double EP, and it was announced that a Fuchsia III album was in preparation. In 2020 as a tribute to Syd Barrett, the Fuchsia-Barretts Allsorts vinyl was released through Fruits de Mer Records. The band continue to play live, Covid permitting.

== Discography ==
- Fuchsia (1971)
- Fuchsia, Mahogonny & other gems (2005)
- Fuchsia II: From Psychedelia...To a Distant Place (2013)
- Song (2017)
