= Computerchemist =

computerchemist is the ongoing solo project of Dave Pearson, a British-Hungarian musician who lives in Székesfehérvár, Hungary.

== Biography ==
Pearson's love of electronic music started as a teenager when he first heard Tangerine Dream's Cloudburst Flight.

During the early 1980s he played synthesiser in a number of rock bands, including Lichfield UK-based Monteagle with founder Mark Thwaite, as well as simultaneously composing his own solo music.

Since 2006 he has issued a number of albums on his own label "Terrainflight".

His music has been likened to "Berliner Schule/Berlin School style jazz-rock".

Bruce Gall of ARFMs "Sunday Synth" has remarked on the crossover style of his playing, invoking comparisons to electronic artists Tangerine Dream, Jean-Michel Jarre, Klaus Schulze, Kraftwerk, and the progressive sounds of Pink Floyd and David Gilmour solo work, Ash Ra Tempel, Mike Oldfield, Steve Hackett, Brian Eno and King Crimson.

=== 2000s ===
During April 2008, SynGate started producing re-issues of the first two albums atmospheric (2006) and icon one(2007), however the agreement was short-lived and SynGate ceased production of the SynGate re-issues in June 2009. The original Terrainflight editions are still available.

Guest musician Robin Hayes played cello on the third release landform(2008), the first time a guest musician had appeared on a computerchemist solo album.

Uwe Cremer, otherwise known as Level Pi, was the guest musician on the fourth album, aqual measure(2009), and played guitar on the title track.

=== 2010s ===
A collaboration project started in July 2010 between Computerchemist and "Nemesis", ex-Hawkwind dancer and singer has produced several tracks, some of which were initially released for free under Creative Commons licensing which had been available on the computerchemist website for free download, with a full album promised at a later date entitled Chronicles of Future Present. The link as of August 2011 to this project is no longer active. The single and first track Sky Turned Black, a rework of Mirage from Aqual Measure, was however released on a charity compilation in October 2012 entitled Space Rock: The Compilation on bandcamp on the "Sound for Good" label.

Computerchemist was featured through the month of August 2010 on WDIY's Galactic Travels show with Bill Fox, as the "Special Focus", where each album was consecutively played back-to-back each week.

A different approach was taken for his fifth album, Music for Earthquakes(2011), involving the conversion of seismograph readings into musical form. It was inspired by the 4.8 richter scale earthquake in Hungary in early 2011, and featured on the national Hungarian news channel Hir24 and Hungarian English Language news site pestiside.hu shortly afterwards.

His sixth double release album, and second collaboration, launched January 2013, Signatures I. and Signatures II. feature the Hungarian drummer Zsolt Galántai, formerly of the Hungarian metal band Ossian.

A single track was specially composed for the "Sound for Good" charity release The Human Condition – Dedications to Philip K. Dick entitled The Pink Beams of Light, He Said, published in March 2013.

The collaboration project "Audio Cologne Project" again with Uwe Cremer and Zsolt Galántai featuring on drums was released in summer 2013.

Since 2013, Pearson has been producing several one-off tracks for compilations and collaborations, notably with artists such as Cousin Silas and Altocirrus.

In 2018, he compiled a series of six CD albums (for which he appeared or produced tracks in various guises on each album) for the radio Spreaker show Aquarian Moons.

In 2019, he produced his first analogue-only synth album for over twenty years, Volcan Dreams, using exclusively Korg Volca analogue sound modules and external guitar effects. Zsolt Galántai guested on drums for one track, and Chris Gill from Band Of Rain played guitar on the opening track Volcan Plain.

=== 2020s ===
In January 2020, That Which Prevails was released, followed shortly afterwards by three retrospective album compilations Origins I-III which were compiled from surviving tapes from Pearson's output between 1980 and 2003.

==== Motion picture soundtrack and awards ====
Pearson's first motion picture soundtrack for the feature film The Fort was released as an album in January 2021. It won an award at the Berlin Indie Film Festival in March 2022 for 'Best Original Score'. A further award followed for 'Best Music Score Feature Film' at the Kiez Berlin Film Festival 2022 has also been shown on the artwork.

==== RadioRay collaborations ====
2021 also introduced a new collaboration partnership with RadioRay, a singer/songwriter who has notably played in Alan Davey's post-Hawkwind band The Psychedelic Warlords. This has led to two albums being released in 2021 and 2022 under the titles Masks and Underneath the Soul.

Alongside the collaborations, a further two solo albums Parallel Thought Experiment and Where the Clouds Touch the Sky were also released in 2021-2022.

== Discography ==
=== Studio albums ===
| Date | Title | Format | Label | Catalog number |
|---|---|---|---|---|
| 2006 | Atmospheric | bandcamp download, CD | terrainflight | TF001; 2008 SynGate CD-R 2090 reissue; now withdrawn |
| 2007 | Icon One | bandcamp download, CD | terrainflight | TF002; 2008 SynGate CD-R 2091 reissue; now withdrawn |
| 2008 | Landform | bandcamp download, CD | terrainflight | TF003 |
| 2009 | Aqual Measure | bandcamp download, CD | terrainflight | TF004 |
| 2010 | The Scheming Machine ft. Nemesis | CD EP | terrainflight | TF005 (no longer available) |
| 2011 | Music for Earthquakes | bandcamp download, CD | terrainflight | TF006 |
| 2013 | Signatures I. ft. Zsolt Galántai | bandcamp download | terrainflight | TF007 |
| 2013 | Signatures II. ft. Zsolt Galántai | bandcamp download | terrainflight | TF008 |
| 2019 | Volcan Dreams | bandcamp download, CD | terrainflight | TF010 |
| 2020 | That Which Prevails | bandcamp download, CD | terrainflight | TF011 |
| 2020 | Origins I. | bandcamp download, CD | terrainflight | TF012 |
| 2020 | Origins II. | bandcamp download, CD | terrainflight | TF013 |
| 2020 | Origins III. | bandcamp download, CD | terrainflight | TF014 |
| 2021 | The Fort: Original Motion Picture Soundtrack | bandcamp download, CD | terrainflight | TF015 |
| 2021 | Masks ft. RadioRay | bandcamp download | terrainflight | TF016 |
| 2021 | Parallel Thought Experiment | bandcamp download, CD | terrainflight | TF017 |
| 2022 | Underneath the Soul ft. RadioRay | bandcamp download | terrainflight | TF018 |
| 2022 | Where the Clouds Touch the Sky | bandcamp download, CD | terrainflight | TF019 |
| 2023 | Mysterious Cave of Eternal Theta | bandcamp download, CD | terrainflight | TF020 |
| 2023 | Origins IV. | bandcamp download | terrainflight | TF021 |
| 2023 | Green Twilight | bandcamp download, CD | terrainflight | TF022 |
| 2023 | New Formulas for Electric Guitar | bandcamp download, CD | terrainflight | TF023 |

=== Compilations and collaborations ===
| Date | Title | Track | Collaborator(s) | Format | Country | Label | Catalog number |
|---|---|---|---|---|---|---|---|
| 2009 | Schwingungen auf CD No. 164 | Atmospheric | | CD | Germany | Cue Records | 164 |
| 2009 | Schwingungen auf CD No. 165 | Timethorns | | CD | Germany | Cue Records | 165 |
| 2010 | Musiczeit Sampler CD No. 12 | Mirage | | CD | United Kingdom | Musiczeit | Sampler 12 |
| 2012 | Space Rock: The Compilation | Sky Turned Black ft. Nemesis | Nemesis | Bandcamp Download | United States | Sound for Good | |
| 2013 | Audio Cologne Project: 2911. | -- | Uwe Cremer, Zsolt Galántai | CD | Hungary | Terrainflight | TF009 |
| 2013 | The Human Condition - Dedications to Philip K. Dick | The Pink Beams of Light, He Said | | Bandcamp Download | United States | Sound for Good | |
| 2017 | Silas and Friends vi part i | Expansion ( For Jaki ) | Cousin Silas | Bandcamp Download | United Kingdom | We Are All Ghosts | waag rel101 |
| 2018 | The Emporium Project - 1point2 | Dronium | Cousin Silas | Bandcamp Download | United Kingdom | We Are All Ghosts | waag rel124 |
| 2018 | Intergalactic Moonloonies Invade Mushroom Hill vol. 1 | La Fungo Arpeggiato | Zsolt Galántai | CD | United States | Aquarian Moons | AMP001 |
| 2018 | Intergalactic Moonloonies Invade Mushroom Hill vol. 3 | Morcellas Dance | Altocirrus | CD | United States | Aquarian Moons | AMP003 |
| 2018 | Intergalactic Moonloonies Invade Mushroom Hill vol. 3 | Low Tide on Mushroom Hill | Etherfysh | CD | United States | Aquarian Moons | AMP003 |
| 2020 | Cousin Silas & Friends volume 8 part 2 | Goodbye, Home Service | Cousin Silas | Bandcamp Download | United Kingdom | We Are All Ghosts | waag rel140 |
| 2022 | Heads Together | That Which Prevails | | CD | United Kingdom | Fruits de Mer Records | Strange Fish 23 |
| 2022 | COORDINATES volume 04 | You Can Never Have Too Much Mellotron | Eagle (Arend Westra) | Bandcamp Download | Italy | EM Force records | 04 |
| 2022 | Sound Clouds 1 | Mellotron Blues | | CD | United Kingdom | Fruits de Mer Records | Friends of the Fish CD16 |
| 2022 | Skullduggery | That Which Prevails | | CD | United Kingdom | Fruits de Mer Records | Promo 30 |
| 2023 | Crab Nebula | Moonfloating | | CD | United Kingdom | Fruits de Mer Records | Friends of the Fish CD20 |
