= Julie's Haircut =

Italian neo-psychedelic rock group

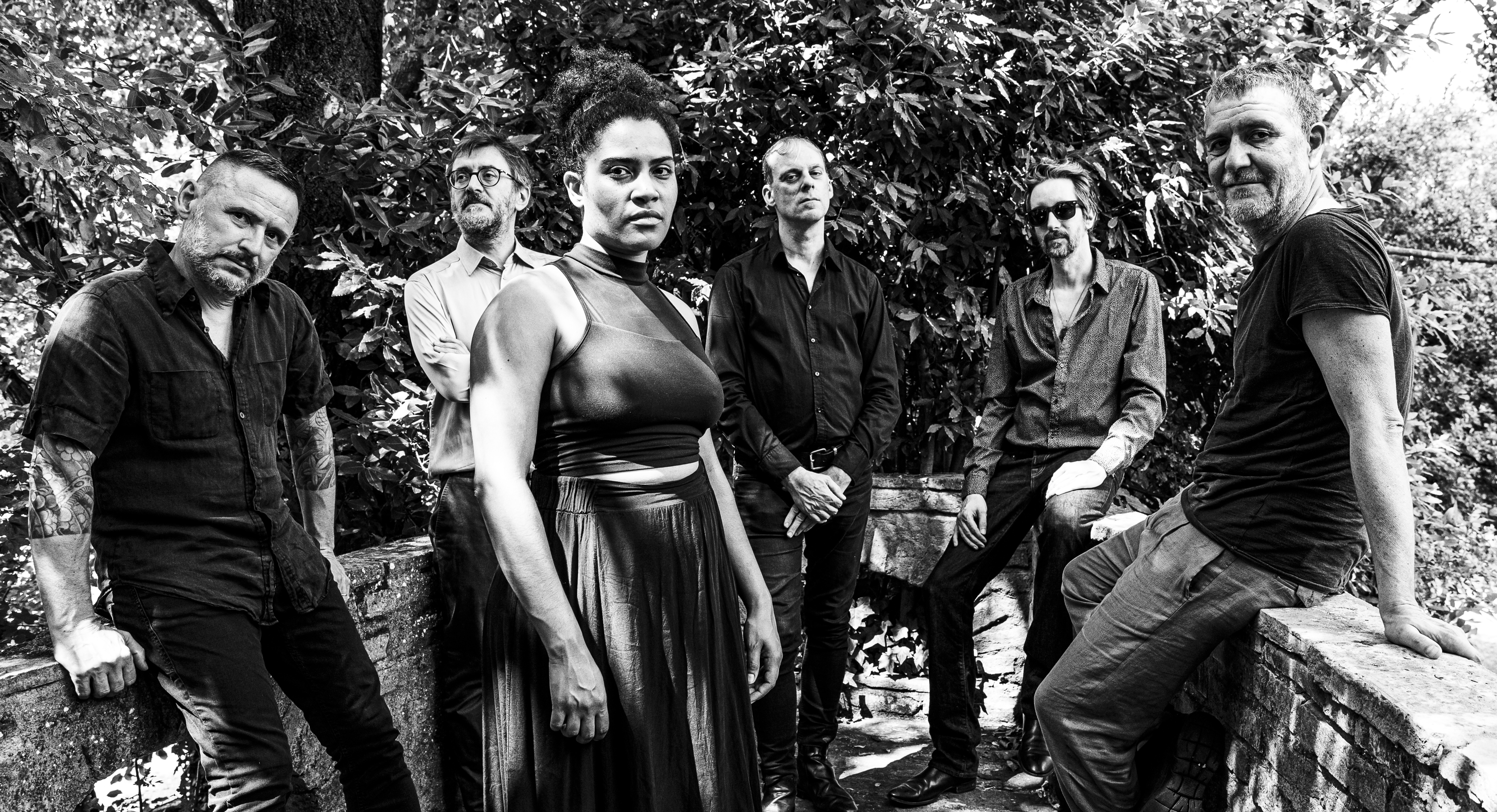
- Julie's Haircut shot by Antonio Viscido, Guastalla 2025

Background information
- Origin: Sassuolo, Emilia, Italy
- Genres: Alternative rock; progressive rock; indie rock; neo-psychedelia; post-rock; experimental rock; psychedelic rock
- Years active: 1994-present
- Labels: Rocket Recordings, Superlove, 42 Records, Woodworm, GammaPop, Homesleep, Sony, Audioglobe, Ghost Records, A Silent Place, Fruits de Mer Records, Weird Beard
- Members: Nicola Caleffi; Luca Giovanardi; Andrea Rovacchi; Andrea Scarfone; Ulises Tramalloni; Anna Bassy
- Past members: Roberto Morselli; Giancarlo Frigieri; Laura Storchi; Laura Sghedoni; Mara Mariani "Reverendo" Fabio Vecchi; Laura Agnusdei
- Website: Official Website

Julie's Haircut is an Italian neo-psychedelic rock group formed in Emilia between Modena and Reggio Emilia in 1994. They sing in English.

== Biography ==
Active since the late nineties, Julie's Haircut is a band originally formed in Sassuolo, northern Italy. Their debut album “Fever in the funk house” (Gammapop, 1999), a strange mixture of garage rock, noisy psychedelia and pop melodies was hailed at by the critics as one of the best debuts in Italian indie rock and was included in the top 50 Italian albums of the 90's by the magazine Rumore.

The follow-up “Stars never looked so bright” (Gammapop, 2001) mixed these elements with a more soulful approach, mirroring the love for 60's black music nurtured by the band.

In 2003, after switching to Homesleep Records Julie's Haircut released their third album “Adult situations”, the first to be internationally distributed. Here, melody and odd psychedelia mingle in a more personal way.

By 2005 the music of Julie's Haircut has moved towards more experimental grounds, focusing on improv and sound research, without losing touch with the groove and melody that characterized their music since day one. The result is their fourth album “After dark, my sweet” (Homesleep, 2006), featuring former Spacemen 3 Sonic Boom, acclaimed as one of the best alternative Italian albums of the year and included in the top 20 psychedelic Italian albums of all time by the magazine Il Mucchio.

In 2006 they also functioned as “sound carriers” for some performances of former Can singer Damo Suzuki, thus entering the Damo Suzuki Network and consolidating a warm and ongoing relationship with the Japanese/German artist. The collaboration with Sonic Boom also resulted in the release, in 2007, of the EP "N-Waves/U-Waves", including studio jams with the English musician.

In 2009 the double album "Our Secret Ceremony" was released by A Silent Place. A new 10” single, featuring cover versions of Alejandro Jodorowsky’s The Tarot, from “The Holy Mountain” soundtrack and Nino Rota’s O Venezia Venaga Venusia, from the "Fellini's Casanova” soundtrack, was released in June 2011. In June 2012 the ep "The Wildlife Variations" was released through Woodworm Music & Trovarobato.

In 2012 the band has begun a collaboration with the American Fluxus composer Philip Corner, resulting in a live performance in Reggio Emilia, a recording of Corner's music under the direction of the composer and a sound installation featured in the exhibition "Women in Fluxus and other experimental tales" held at Palazzo Magnani in Reggio Emilia. In 2013 their instrumental album “Ashram Equinox” was released, followed one year later by a digital-only release of a deluxe edition including various outtakes and remixes. In 2017 the album ”Invocation And Ritual Dance Of My Demon Twin” was released for the British label Rocket Recordings, followed by the standalone digital single "Burning Tree".

In 2019 their sophomore album for the English label, "In the Silence Electric", is released.

Between 2021 and 2025 the band released a series of digital singles both on Rocket Recordings and their own imprint Superlove.

In 2025 the album "Radiance Opposition", the first featuring the singer/songwriter Anna Bassy, is released in the UK by Weird Beard and in EU by Superlove, the band's own imprint.

== Discography ==
=== LP ===
- 1999 - Fever in the Funk House, Gamma Pop
- 2001 - Stars Never Looked So Bright, Gamma Pop
- 2003 - Adult Situations, Homesleep/Sony
- 2006 - After Dark My Sweet, Homesleep/Audioglobe
- 2009 - Our Secret Ceremony, A Silent Place
- 2013 - Ashram Equinox, Woodworm/Santeria/Crash Symbols
- 2017 - Invocation And Ritual Dance Of My Demon Twin, Rocket Recordings
- 2019 - Music from The Last Command, 42 Records
- 2019 - In The Silence Electric, Rocket Recordings
- 2025 - Radiance Opposition, Superlove/Weird Beard

=== EP & Singles ===
- 1998 - I'm in Love with Someone Older Than Me 7-inch single, Gamma Pop
- 1999 - Everyone Needs Someone to Fuck 7-inch single, Gamma Pop/Superlove
- 2000 - I Wanna Be a Pop Rock Star! - The Plague of Alternative Rock CD, Gamma pop/Superlove
- 2001 - Everything Is Alright CD single, Gamma Pop/Superlove
- 2001 - Set the World on Fire CD single, Gamma Pop/Superlove
- 2001 - The Black Christmas EP CD single, Gamma Pop/Superlove
- 2003 - The Power of Psychic Revenge CD, Homesleep
- 2004 - Marmalade(EP), remix collection CD, Homesleep
- 2005 - Julie's Haircut/Judah split 7-inch single, Black Candy/Superlove
- 2007 - Julie's Haircut with Sonic Boom: N-Waves / U-Waves 10-inch/CD EP, A Silent Place/Superlove
- 2009 - Julie's Haircut with Mariposa: Concerto Grosso tour gift CD-R, giveaway on the tour "Concerto Grosso"
- 2011 - Julie's Haircut play Jodorowsky & Rota 10-inch, Gamma Pop/Ghost Records/Superlove
- 2012 - The Wildlife Variations 12-inch, WoodWorm/Trovarobato/Superlove
- 2012 - Dark Leopards of the Moon, remix collection digital single, Superlove
- 2013 - Downtown Love Tragedies (pt. 1 & 2) split 7-inch single with Cut, Gamma Pop
- 2015 - Sidesteps split 12-inch single with Sendelica, Fruits de Mer Records
- 2018 - Burning Tree digital single, Rocket Recordings
- 2018 - Karlsruhe/Fountain 12-inch single, Superlove
- 2020 - Jihang/Orpheus Rising split digital single with Rainbow Island, Superlove
- 2021 - The Skull digital single, Superlove
- 2023 - Plaster Mask digital single, Rocket Recordings
- 2024 - Skull Flower digital single, Superlove
- 2025 - Unit Circle digital single, Superlove
- 2025 - Wounds digital single, Superlove
- 2025 - To the Sacred Mantle digital single, Superlove
- 2026 - Unit Circle (Ondakeiki Remix) digital single, Superlove

== Line-up ==
- Nicola Caleffi: guitars, keyboards, percussions, bass, vocals (1994–present)
- Luca Giovanardi: guitars, keyboards, bass, electronics, vocals (1994–present)
- Andrea Rovacchi: keyboards, percussions (2006–present)
- Andrea Scarfone: guitars, bass (2005–present)
- Ulisse Tramalloni: drums, percussions (2010–present)
- Anna Bassy: vocals (2024–present)

== Ex Members ==
- Laura Storchi: bass, keyboards, vocals (1994–2005)
- Giancarlo Frigieri: drums, percussion (1995–1997)
- Rev. Fabio Vecchi: rhodes, organ, synth (2000–2005)
- Roberto Morselli: drums, percussion (1997–2010)
- Laura Sghedoni: bass, vocals (2006–2007)
- Mara Mariani: bass, vocals (2007)
- Laura Agnusdei: alto and tenor saxophones (2015–2020)
