= Dead Horse One =

French neo-psychedelic/shoegaze band

- Origin: Valence, France
- Genres: Alternative rock, neo-psychedelia, shoegaze
- Years active: 2011–present
- Labels: Cranes Records, Dead Bees Records, Hands and Moment, A Quick One Records, Les Disques De La Face Cachée, Requiem Pour Un Twister
- Members: Olivier Debard; Ludovik Naud; Antoine Pinet; Maxime Garcia; Ivan Tziboulsky
- Past members: Jérôme Simonian
- Website: www.deadhorseone.com

Dead Horse One are a neo-psychedelic/shoegaze band based in Valence, France. The band was founded in 2011 by Olivier Debard, Ludovik Naud, Antoine Pinet (a former member of French band H-Burns) and Jérôme Simonian. Simonian later departed, and Maxime Garcia and Ivan Tziboulsky joined.

== History ==
Following an eponymous, self-released 2012 EP, the band issued the Heavenly Choir of Jet Engines EP on Cranes Records later that year, as well as a split 10" EP with the Dead Mantra.

In 2012, Dead Horse One joined the Dead Bees Records roster and was featured on the label's 11th and 12th sampler compilations. They also appeared on two compilations from Nothing Collective.

Dead Horse One's first full-length effort, Without Love We Perish, was produced by Mark Gardener of Ride. It was first issued in March 2014 in CD format by Hands and Moment (Japan) and on vinyl by A Quick One Records (France). On January 22, 2015, it was reissued on vinyl by Les Disques De La Face Cachée/Dead Bees Records.

The band's second album, Season of Mist, was released in 2017.

== Discography ==
=== Studio albums ===
- Without Love We Perish (2014, Hands and Moment/A Quick One Records; 2015 Les Disques De La Face Cachée/Dead Bees Records)
- Season of Mist (2017, Requiem Pour Un Twister)
- The West Is the Best (2019, Requiem Pour Un Twister)
- Seas of Static (2024)

=== EPs ===
- Dead Horse One EP (2012, self-released)
- Dead Mantra / Dead Horse One split 10" EP with the Dead Mantra (2012, Cranes Records)
- Heavenly Choir of Jet Engines EP (2012, Cranes Records)
- When Love Runs Dry (2022)

=== Compilation appearances ===
- "Alone" on Dead Bees Records Label Sampler 11 (2012, Dead Bees Records)
- "Gaze" on Songs from Nøthing #2 (2014, Nøthing Collective)
- "I Love My Man" on Dead Bees Records Label Sampler 12 (2014, Dead Bees Records)
- "Hopper" on Songs from Nøthing #03 (2015, Nøthing Collective)
