= Psychotropia =

- 2004 Castle Music CD cover

Studio album by Nick Nicely
- Released: 2003 (LP); 5 July 2004 (CD)
- Recorded: 1978–2004
- Genre: Psychedelia; post-psychedelia; hypnagogic pop; synthpop; electronic pop; psychedelic rock
- Length: 65:53 (CD)
- Label: Tenth Planet; Castle Music
- Producer: Nick Nicely

Nick Nicely chronology
Psychotropia (2003)	Lysergia (2011)

Psychotropia is the debut album by English psychedelic musician Nick Nicely (typically stylised in lower case as nick nicely), first released as an LP by Tenth Planet in 2003 and as a CD by Castle Music in 2004. Nicely had started fusing psychedelic and electronic music in the late 1970s, and in the early 1980s he released two singles, "DCT Dreams" and "Hilly Fields (1892)". While the singles were critically acclaimed, they were commercial failures, which partly contributed to Nicely's retirement from the public eye shortly after. While his works were being praised by several of his contemporaries, he continued to record material into the mid-1980s, and then again in the late 1990s.

As interest in Nicely's work increased in the 2000s, Psychotropia was released with help from compiler David Wells, containing his early 1980s material along with unreleased tracks, digitally remastered by Nicely. While some categorise the album as a compilation, Nicely regards Psychotropia to be a studio album that just took a great deal of time to record. The original version of the album was a limited edition LP released by Wells through his Tenth Planet imprint, followed by an extended CD edition from Castle Music in 2004. Helping to cement Nicely's status as a cult figure, the album received generally positive reviews from music critics, and its sound has been cited as a precursor to the emerging hypnagogic pop movement.

== Background ==
=== Nick Nicely's career ===
Growing up in Hitchin and Deptford, England, Nick Nicely developed an early fascination with intricate psychedelic music in the 1960s, from artists like Joe Meek, the Beatles, Pink Floyd and King Crimson. His discovery of the eclectic folk compilation Nice Enough to Eat (1969), which featured styles of "guitar freak-outs, blues, pastoral folk and psych," was one of his formative influences, and in the mid-1970s he developed into a folk singer, but he soon found inspiration in Euro-disco and from German electronic groups like Neu!, Can and Kraftwerk. He moved to London and developed a solo career, and his 1978 home recordings attracted the attention of music publisher Heath Levy, who intended him to work as an in-house songwriter. Nevertheless, after hearing more of Nicely's demos, they let him record the songs "DCT Dreams" and "Treeline" on an advance sum in a professional studio.

Released in 1980 in a pressing of 900 copies on Nicely's own Voxette label, despite release offers from 4AD and Charisma Records, "DCT Dreams" was influenced by the Beatles' psychedelic work, the Human League and Nicely's own experiences with LSD; Nicely described it as "a psych collision with electronic synth music", and in the words of AllMusic's Heather Phares, the song is "half angular synth pop in the vein of Tubeway Army and half the kind of trippy atmosphere that hadn't been heard since the '60s". Fact described "DCT Dreams" and its B-side "Treeline" as the missing link between the Beatles and modern day "robo-romanticism" acts like Gary Numan and John Foxx, and alongside Foxx's The Golden Section (1983), they felt it exemplified synthpop's reconnection with British psychedelia. It was distributed in Europe and South America and reached number two on the Dutch 'Tip sheet' chart, but made no impact in the United Kingdom, despite a 1981 re-release by German label Ariola Hansa. Finding "DCT Dreams" to be a burgeoning example of the New Romantic scene, Some Bizzare Records almost included it on their influential compilation Some Bizzare Album (1980), but at the last minute the compilers were discouraged by the song's minor European success.

Nicely sold his home studio to finance his subsequent single, "Hilly Fields (1892)", which he recorded in Alvic Studio over six months, the long recording duration reflecting his increasing perfectionism. Continuing his Beatles-inspired experimentation, he felt the song's "early '80s electronics are more muted within the psych vibe" than they had been on his previous single. "Crammed with ideas" according to Fact, the song includes keyboards, cello and drum parts played by friends, and what is considered the earliest example of scratching in a non-hip hop song. Nicely named it after the park near his then home in Brockley, in south-east London. Released on EMI in January 1982, the single failed to gain any commercial traction. Nonetheless, it was released to critical acclaim, and the NME named it "the best psychedelic record made since the '60s." The song's B-side "49 Cigars" was recorded in a much shorter period of two days, and was inspired by the Beatles' "Tomorrow Never Knows" (1966), with both songs being what he felt were "disorientating twists of abstract psychedelia, but always wrapped around a tune". The "swirling" track contains "phasers-set-to-stun" and a disorienting telephone conversation between Nick Whitecross of Kissing the Pink and his girlfriend.

=== 'Lost' recordings and compilation ===
In 1982, the song "On the Coast" was proposed for release as Nicely's third single, but the plans fell through. Nicely felt he was "trying too hard to be commercial" and did not feel Ian Pearce's drum pattern on the track was suitable (though Nicely directed Pearce at the time). He also refused to give EMI a single due to their lack of promotion for "Hilly Fields (1892)", although he also felt bad he had not delivered an album to the label and that he didn't perform live. Prior to its eventual release on Psychotropia, Nicely tweaked the song slightly to improve it. While EMI continued funding Nicely's attempts to create a follow-up single, the sessions of which included "Elegant Daze", which is said to be the closest Nicely came to 1980s production, Nicely was losing interest and stopped communicating with EMI, who subsequently dropped him. Heath Levy had "shafted" Nicely of his royalties and he began a battle with depression that lasted the remainder of the decade.

Phares states that while Nicely had other tracks ready to release as singles, the commercial failure of "Hilly Fields" and the lack of royalties he received from "DCT Dreams" meant Nicely was unable to create music in the fashion he desired and he thus retired from the public eye, his only released musical contributions for the remainder of the 20th century being backing vocals on Paul Roland's A Cabinet of Curiosities (1987) and acid house and rave music collaborations with his friend Gavin Mills under the names Psychotropic, Airtight and Freefall. Besides his rave music, he continued to be inspired by other music in the two decades, including New Order's "Blue Monday" (1983), Tears for Fears' Songs from the Big Chair (1985) and Portishead's Dummy (1994). In 1997, he once again began recording as Nick Nicely, with new tracks like "On the Beach" both reflecting his dance music productions as well as his early 1980s sound.

During his time away from the public eye, Nicely's unusual blend of electronic pop and psychedelic rock had influenced contemporaries including Robyn Hitchcock of the Soft Boys and Andy Partridge of XTC, while Robert Wyatt spoke highly of "49 Cigars". XTC's psychedelic side project band the Dukes of Stratosphear were especially inspired by Nicely, with their debut album 25 O'Clock (1985) drawing strong influence from "Hilly Fields (1892)". Interest in Nicely as a "lost legend" continued to grow into the 2000s, to the point where British music reissue compiler David Wells, who specialised in compiling compilations of psychedelic music, discovered that Nicely had recorded a wealth of unreleased material beyond his early 1980s singles. Hoping to bring the unreleased material together, he chiefly conceived the idea for Psychotropia, a collection of both Nicely's released and unreleased material, to which Nicely agreed. The album is Nicely's first album and first release as Nick Nicely since 1982. John Reed, Jon Richards and Steve Hammonds are credited as the album's coordinators. Nicely remastered all the tracks himself.

== Composition ==
Psychotropia contains the four songs from Nicely's two 1980s singles as well as a collection of demos, mostly taken from old cassette tapes, that he had recorded throughout the years. While some categorise the album as a compilation, Nicely disagrees and thinks of Psychotropia as "all one album", albeit with "just a lot of years" between the songs' recording dates. The original, limited edition LP edition of the album contains thirteen songs recorded between 1979–1985 and one from 1997, while the original CD version contains eighteen tracks recorded between 1979–2004, with the additional tracks being Nicely's recordings from 1997–98, 2003 and 2004. The re-released CD contains an extra track, "Marlon", recorded in 1986. The song was recorded with Peter Marsh on a four-track recorder.

The album documents Nicely's work as a mixer of psychedelic rock and electronic pop, while also reflecting Nicely's experience with dance music in the album's later-produced songs. Richie Unterberger said the album combines sounds of 1967-68 British psychedelic music with elements from post-1980 electronics and production, noting the influence of Syd Barrett-era Pink Floyd and the Beatles' work of 1967, as well as a possibly equal influence from "all those obscure British acts that have filled up U.K. '60s psych rarities compilations from the time of Chocolate Soup for Diabetics onward". Nicely combines elements of those styles, including phasing, unusual electronic manipulation, the "melancholic buzzing orchestral waves" of keyboards, guitars and strings, vocals that have been cited as "underwater- and outer space-beamed" as well as brief, distant spoken phrases.

Jim Irvin wrote that Psychotropia "feels like three decades of music – Beatles, Eno, Utopia, Buggles, MBV – flashing by in a spaceship, a delirious pop fans ecstatic narcotic rush". Saying that some of its songs paid tribute to music of the past while anticipating music yet to come, and noting the conspicuous usage of the Fairlight synth on some songs, Uncut found the album to be a work of "faux-psych" and post-psychedelia. Algemeen Dagblad found the album bridged the gap between 1960s psychedelia, 1980s New Romantic and 2000s new wave revival. Sound effects, studio trickery and oscillations complement the hooky melodies, erudite lyrics and "controlled production." The lyrical bent was described by Richard Mason of Ugly Things as possessing a "deeply personal and impressionistic nature," while he felt that wistful melodies and psychedelic modalities were among the album's key characteristics. He felt the album reflected Nicely's position as a part of the DIY music scene of the late 1970s and early 1980s.

=== Songs ===
Nicely's favourite song on the album, "On the Beach (The Ladder Descends)", was inspired by a depressed, post-natal woman who lived on an island off the Essex/Suffolk coast and who committed suicide by walking out of her house and drowning in the sea, with the song's first lyrics marked by existentialist themes and the remaining lyrics conceptually dealing with self-destruction. Recorded in 1997–98, Nicely was only able to master the song onto a cassette recorder, hence its lo-fidelity quality. The song is a whooshing, refined work of psychedelic pop minimalism with elements of Balearic music to belie its "post-rave provenance". Critic Ian Shirley said the song impresses listeners with the music's inventive "persuasion". One journalist described "Beverly" as "[looking] back to Scott Walker and forward to the Beloved and Ibiza bliss".

The title track "Psychotropia" features what Nicely felt was a disorientating "feeling of release". His desire to pursue such 'freedom' was partly down to his love of freeform soloing in works such as John Coltrane's Blue Train (1958). Dating from 1979, "1923" is one of the oldest recordings on the album, recorded on a four-track recorder in Nicely's home in Brockley, London. Nicely's friend Geoff Leach contributed, playing piano and creating abstract sounds which Nicely taped and added to the track. However, the song's potential publishers Heath Levy were uninterested in the song. Nicely included the song on the album as he found many people liked it, but when asked what song he would take off the album if he could, he picked "1923". "Everyone Knows" was recorded in 1998, though still bears the "omnipresent melodic touch, wistful ambience and focused vision" of Nicely's earlier work.

== Release ==
Reflecting interest in Nicely's music, Psychotropia has been released three times. Psychotropia was first released as an 180gm audiophile LP in 2003 by David Wells' own label Tenth Planet, with artwork from Phil Smee and sleeve notes from Wells. This in turn led to a CD version released on 5 July 2004 by Castle Music. This edition features five extra tracks and new artwork (described by one critic as Pythonesque) from Tom Ornshaw, while retaining Wells' sleeve notes. Following the financial problems of Castle Music's parent label Sanctuary Records, the CD edition was soon deleted from print. In 2010, the album was made available on CD again in a new version by Cherry Red Records, this version containing the bonus track "Marlon" and another new sleeve design, by Andy Morton of Pepperbox.

=== Critical reception ===
Professional ratings
Review scores
Source	Rating
Allmusic	3.5/5 stars
Mojo	4/5 stars
Record Collector	3/5 stars
Uncut	3/5 stars

One account said that the album was released to acclaim from music critics. Reviewing the original LP release, Richard Mason of Ugly Things was favourable, praising the album's "uncanny feel of a realised and structured album rather than the compilation it actually is. This is surely a testament to the singular originality and determinedly individualistic talent of Nick Nicely. The lyrical and musical continuity is startling. Beautiful, wistful melodies comprised with a lyrical bent of a deeply personal and impressionistic nature." Among those reviewing the CD, Matthjis Linneman of Oor highly recommended the album and wrote that, despite Nicely's career ending with commercial failure in 1982, Psychotropia "proves that his song writing abilities have remained constant over the years" while away from the public eye, citing for instance "On the Beach (The Ladder Descends)", which he felt "approaches the quality of 'Hilly Fields'". Adam Clayson of Record Collector called Psychotropia "[a] retrospective that transcends mere period charm".

Jim Irvin of Mojo said the album "feels like three decades of music – Beatles, Eno, Utopia, Buggles, MBV – flashing by in a spaceship, a delirious pop fans ecstatic narcotic rush. Personally, I'd have edited it into a concise, perfect 12 tracker, but you can do that yourself. Marvellous." Uncut felt that "Mr Nicely does a very pleasing line in faux-psych." While finding the weaker songs to "sound like Soft Cell outtakes or Erasure on ketamine", they felt the best material "belongs with the pantheon of great post-psychedelica", alongside Prince's Around the World in a Day (1985). Richie Unterberger of AllMusic felt "there's also an overall air of clouded disengagement and retreat into an impenetrable imaginary world, which makes his work less gripping than that of the best astral minstrels of yore. If those embellishments are enough for you, this is ear candy, with a lot of dense layers of sound that take a while to get your mind around, even if it's sometimes like being caught in a hallucinogenic crossfire." Reviewing the 2010 reissue, Ian Shirley of Record Collector said, "Despite being recorded at different times between the 80s and 00s, tracks such as 'Elegant Daze' and 'On the Coast' hang together like the two sides of a fantastic lost classic." He also praised David Wells' sleeve notes.

=== Legacy ===
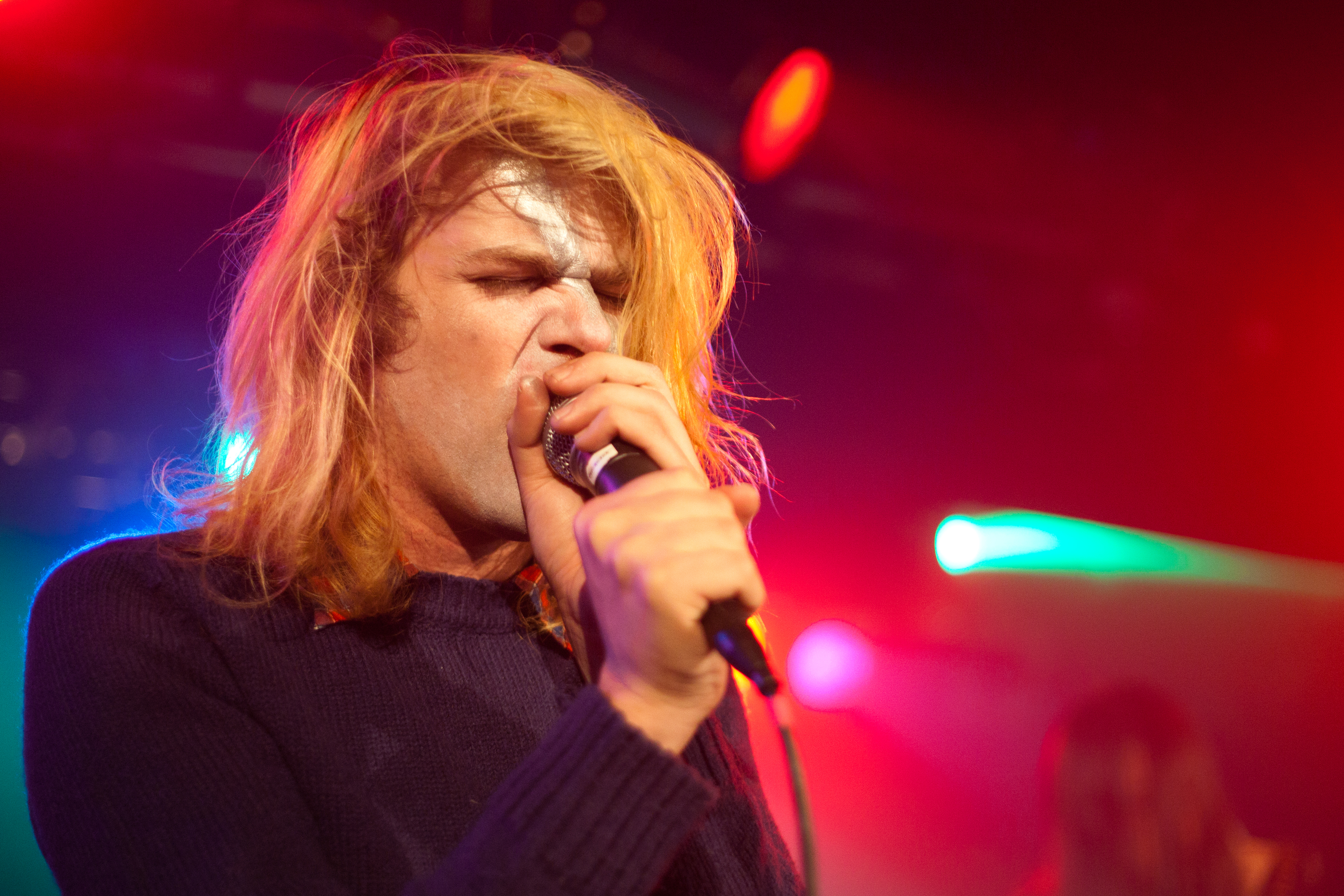
Artists including Ariel Pink (pictured) lauded the album. Ariel Pink played live with Nicely in 2008.

In gathering Nicely's material in an anthology style, Psychotropia helped make it easier to listen to his body of work, and since the album's release, his reputation has grown. Acclaim for the album poured in from artists including Ariel Pink and John Maus, both of whom Nicely would perform live dates with in 2012 and touring the USA opening for Maus in 2019. Other artists from American underground music such as Nite Jewel and Gary War also praised the album. The simultaneous hypnagogic pop scene, to which Ariel Pink and John Maus are linked, revived interest in Nicely's work, and today his 1980s recordings are seen as "the sound of the 2000s hypnagogic pop movement decades beforehand". Rock band Temples called Psychotropia a "completely overlooked album. It should be a classic album, but it’s overlooked completely." Unkle enjoyed the album, and approached Nicely for collaboration on their song "Puppeteers" (2011), a song Nicely described as more psychedelic than his usual style. Amorphous Androgynous included "49 Cigars" on their critically acclaimed various artists compilation A Monstrous Psychedelic Bubble Exploding in Your Mind: Volume 1 (2008). Nick Nicely would begin making music more regularly, releasing several albums in the 2010s, including Space of a Second (2014) and Sleep Safari (2017).

== Track listing ==
All songs written by Nick Nicely, except where noted

=== LP version ===
Side one

1. "Hilly Fields (1892)"
2. "D.C.T. Dreams"
3. "Treeline" (Goeff Leach, Nicely)
4. "49 Cigars"
5. "Beverly"
6. "Elegant Daze"
7. "On the Coast"

Side two

1. "The Other Side"
2. "On the Beach"
3. "1923"
4. "Remember"
5. "6B Obergine"
6. "Everyone Knows"

=== CD version ===
1. "Hilly Fields (1982)" – 3:33
2. "Treeline" (Leach, Nicely) – 3:30
3. "49 Cigars" – 2:39
4. "Beverly" – 2:52
5. "On the Beach (The Ladder Descends)" – 3:54
6. "Pscychotropia" – 5:03
7. "A Hundred Years Later" – 3:46
8. "Heaven's Gate" – 4:13
9. "Remember" –2:44
10. "Elegant Daze" – 2:54
11. "D.C.T. Dreams" – 4:09
12. "The Other Side" – 3:40
13. "On the Coast 2" – 2:35
14. "Everyone Knows" – 3:49
15. "1923" – 6:23
16. "6B Obergine" – 3:32
17. "On the Coast" – 2:57
18. "The Doors of Perception" – 4:33

CD bonus track (2010)

19. "Marlon" (featuring Peter Marsh) – 4:33

== Personnel ==
- Nick Nicely – writing, remastering
- Phil Smee – sleeve design (LP version)
- Tom Ornshaw – sleeve art (2004 CD version)
- Tina Carr – black and white photos
- David Wells – liner notes
- John Reed – co-ordinator
- Jon Richards – co-ordinator
- Steve Hammonds – co-ordinator
