= The Chemistry Set (American band) =

- Origin: Dallas, Texas
- Genres: Indie pop Psychedelic pop Art rock
- Years active: 2002 - hiatus (or otherwise specified)
- Label: Self
- Past members: Stephen Duncan (vocalist, guitarist, Wurlitzer electric piano); Meredith Knoll (keyboardist, vocalist); Cory Helms (bass guitarist, guitarist, keyboardist, glockenspiel, vocalist); Josh Hoover (drums)
- Website: myspace.com/thechemistryset

The Chemistry Set was an indie pop band from Dallas, Texas, USA, formed in 2002. The four band members met at a party and created a psychedelic pop, progressive band. Stephen Duncan wrote the band's songs with influences including David Bowie, the Beatles, the Flaming Lips, Led Zeppelin and the Shins. The band has two albums including The Chemistry Set, released in 2004, and Blue Monsters, which was self-released in 2006.

The group received a Dallas Observer Music Award nomination for Best New Act in 2003. The band's single, "Into the Light," was featured on the series One Tree Hill in 2007. The Chemistry Set went on hiatus in 2008, but performed a reunion show in Dallas, TX in 2012.

== Band members ==
- Stephen Duncan: vocals, guitar, Wurlitzer electric piano
- Meredith Knoll: keyboards, vocals
- Cory Helms: bass guitar, guitar, keyboards, glockenspiel, vocals
- Josh Hoover: drums

== Discography ==
- The Chemistry Set (2004)
- Blue Monsters (2006)
