= Michael Garrison (musician) =

- Born: Michael Earl Garrison; November 28, 1956; Roseburg, Oregon, US
- Died: 24 March 2004 (aged 47) Bend, Oregon, US
- Genres: Ambient music, electronic music
- Occupation: musician
- Instrument: synthesizer
- Years active: 1979–1998

Michael Garrison (November 28, 1956, in Roseburg, Oregon, – March 24, 2004, in Bend, Oregon) was a synthesist from Oregon, United States.

== Life and career ==
Michael Earl Garrison was born in Roseburg, Oregon, on November 28, 1956, to William Garrison and Sharon (Walker) Curry. His father worked as a banker and his mother was a homemaker. Michael Garrison died on March 24, 2004, in Bend, Oregon, of massive liver failure from prolonged overuse of alcohol.

Garrison graduated from Bend High School in 1975 and attended the University of Idaho, where he served as the president of the Central Oregon chapter of the University of Oregon Duck Athletic Club. While studying music and psychology at the University of Idaho, he started to form the basis for his first release on his own label, Windspell Records, later known as Garrisongs Music. The original work was titled In The Regions of Sunreturn (see ) and was created under the impression of the Voyager missions. Later he signed with BMG in 1980, the sleeve design was altered. When re-issued on CD through Windspell in the early 1990s, the title was changed to In The Regions of Sunreturn and Beyond since there were some extra tracks included with the album.

He was influenced by the European innovators of electronic music, like Klaus Schulze, Tangerine Dream, and Jean Michel Jarre.

== Discography ==
=== Albums ===
- In the Regions of Sunreturn (1979)
- Prisms (1981)
- Eclipse (1982)
- Point of Impact (1983)
- Images (1986)
- Aurora Dawn (1988)
- An Earth-Star Trilogy (1989)
- The Rhythm of Life (1991)
- Live: Volume 1 (1995)
- Live: Volume 2 (1995)
- Brave New Worlds (1998)

=== Best of compilations ===
- A Positive Reflecting Glow (1992)
- Tranquility Cove (1992)

=== Compilation contributions ===
- Wolkenreise: Zwischen Traum und Phantasie (1985)

=== Tribute album ===
- To the Sky and Beyond the Stars: A Tribute to Michael Garrison (2005)
