= The Chemistry Set (British band) =

- Origin: London, England
- Genres: Neo-psychedelia
- Years active: 1987–present
- Labels: Current:Dead Bees records Fruits de Mer Records, Tsunami Music, Hypnote. Past: Imaginary, Romilar-d, Munster,Bucketfull of Brains Acid Tapes
- Members: Paul Lake; David Mclean
- Website: facebook.com/thechemistrysetuk

The Chemistry Set are a psychedelic band from London, United Kingdom. Composed of former members of bands in the late 1980s neo-psychedelic scene, the group received regular airplay on John Peel's show and appeared on Tony Wilson's BBC2 show, 100%.

== Original career ==
The original line up consisted of Ashley Wood (rhythm guitar/vocals), Paul Lake (lead guitar/vocals), Henry Taprell (bass) and Dave McLean (drums/vocals), with Neil Pond (Harmonica and percussion) joining them onstage and in the studio. Wood and Lake had met at secondary school in south east London and had previously played together in other bands.

The first Chemistry Set release was in 1988, an eponymous cassette of bedroom demos, released on the Acid Tapes label. This was followed by several flexi discs between 1988 and 1990, which received international attention; The Chemistry Set were featured in fanzines in the UK, Spain, Italy, Holland, Greece, Germany, Sweden, Japan, USA, Australia and New Zealand, and their tracks were included on compilation LPs in the UK, Spain and Germany.

The band started out on the London gig circuit, playing venues such as The Camden Falcon and The Mean Fiddler, and later toured throughout the UK, Europe and the United States, including playing the CMJ Festival in New York, supporting Hawkwind at Brixton Academy, and touring with Robyn Hitchcock, plus regular gigs at London venues like the Rough Trade record shop, The Marquee and The Borderline.

1990–91 saw Imaginary Records release two 12" EP singles (also issued on CD) in the UK. "Don't Turn Away" made the UK Indie Top 20 whilst its follow "The Candle Burns" appeared the following year.

The Spanish release of "Don't Turn Away" made the national Top 20. They recorded an album during this period, Sounds Like Painting', which was issued exclusively in Spain, by Romilard. The ten-track album included a cover of Love's "A House is Not a Motel", sung by McLean.

== Later years ==
Following the departure of bassist Henry Taprell and songwriter/vocalist Ashley Wood, the group recruited new members but did not release any further material. Following a long hiatus, Lake and Mclean reappeared in 2008, releasing their 1989 album Sounds Like Painting.

In Spain, their music has appeared on twelve radio stations including Disco Grande. Spanish producer Manel Ibanez approached Lake and Mclean to produce their new mini-LP, Alchemy#101, which was recorded and mixed in a studio on an island in the middle of the River Thames using vintage instruments (including Farfisas and Mellotrons) recorded through pro-tools, then mixed and produced in Barcelona by Ibanez.

In 2011 the band performed live for the first time in 20 years, with Spanish collaborators, featuring more electronics than previously. They performed at several summer festivals across Europe accompanied by visuals from VJ Matrona.

Since their comeback, the band has had released three new EPs/CDs: Alchemy # 101, This Day Will Never Happen Again, and Chemistry is Just Numbers. A remix of their version of "See Emily Play" was included on a three-CD box-set tribute to Pink Floyd, The Many Faces Of Pink Floyd. As of November 2014, they had recorded four vinyl singles for Fruits de Mer Records.

== Format of releases ==
The Chemistry Set have said that they release EPs to maintain high quality control and consistency. Each EP contains a French version of a song ("Regarde Le Ciel" was recorded in French by a singer from Barcelona, Suzette de la grace Faberge, a member of Indie pop band Les Tres Bien Ensemble) and an obscure cover. The band work with Barcelona photographer and designer Blanca Viñas for their cover art.
