= Samavayo =

German rock band

- Origin: Berlin, DE
- Genres: Rock; Stoner rock Hard rock Alternative metal
- Years active: 2000–present
- Labels: Setalight; Noisolution
- Members: Behrang Alavi; Andreas Voland; Stephan Voland
- Past members: Marco Wirth

Samavayo is a German rock band signed to Noisolution, originating from Berlin. It is a rock trio, with Behrang Alavi on vocals and guitar, Andreas Voland on bass and Stephan Voland on drums. The band has acquired an underground following, as they played over 500 shows in Europe and a number of its songs have been featured in German and Persian TV and Radio.

== History ==
Samavayo recorded and self released their debut EP in 2003 on their label Setalight Records. Soon after they signed with Nasoni Records and released their debut album, Death.March.Melodies!, in 2005. Between 2003 and 2012 Samavayo played more than 500 concerts in Europa, which made them a high quality live band. They played a lot of festivals, such as Rock Am Ring, Hurricane, and Taubertal Festival, as well as many small pubs and clubs. Samavayo was supporting many international acts such as Biffy Clyro, Nebula, Mustasch, Brant Bjork or The Kooks. In 2010, the released their second album, One Million Things, that also was released in Benelux and Iran. This record contains songs as "Rollin", "Wait or Go" and "Teheran Girl". With the song "Teheran Girl" the band showed their engagement with the Green Revolution in Iran. An interview with singer Behrang Alavi, who was born in Teheran, was broadcast on BBC Persia in the evening of June 12, 2009 after the election was announced and the revolution started. The Video of "Teheran Girl" was released shortly after and shows the violence in the streets of Teheran in these days. Samavayo was nominated with "Teheran Girl" for the "Freedom to Create Award 2009". In 2010, Behrang Alavi was also interviewed in Iranian documentary Rock on Fans (director: Shahyar Kabiri). In 2011, their third album Cosmic Knockout was released on Setalight Records. The album was recorded in their own studio with their live sound engineer Jens Güttes. Cosmic Knockout was released in Iran in January 2012 on Zurvan Records.

In 2012, Samavayo released their fourth album Soul Invictus, which also contains the first song with Persian lyrics, called "Roozhaye Roshan" (engl. Days of Light), on Setalight. In 2013, Marco Wirth left the band and Samavayo continued as a trio since. In 2016, the band released their fifth album, Dakota. In 2018, Samavayo changed to the music label Noisolution and published the album Vatan in the same year.

== Discography ==
- 131 (2003) - EP
- Songs For The Drop-Outs (2004) - EP
- Death.March.Melodies! - Album (2005)
- White - EP (2008)
- Black - EP (2008)
- One Million Things - Album (2010)
- Cosmic Knockout - Album (2011)
- Soul Invictus - Album (2012)
- Dakota - Album (2016)
- Vatan - Album (2018)
- Payan - Album (2022)
