= The Jet Age =

American indie rock band

The Jet Age (TJA) is an American indie rock band based in the Washington, D.C. area.

Their sound has been compared to Ted Leo, Dinosaur Jr., The Wedding Present, Hüsker Dü, The Clean, The Feelies, and The Who. When playing live performances The Jet Age is a three-piece consisting of guitar, bass and drums. TJA has released six full-length records to date and has completed two national U.S. tours (both including in-studio performances for Seattle's KEXP) and two tours opening for The Wedding Present (the 2010 East Coast tour and closing the 2010 U.K tour). Chris Dahlen of Pitchfork gave TJA's 2008 release "What Did You Do During the War, Daddy?" an 8.0, saying, "[A]ll the riffs are stellar." Mark Jenkins, writing for The Washington Post, described the band's 2009 offering "In Love" as having "an ecstatic roar." The Jet Age released their fourth studio album, Domestic Disturbances, on 10 January 2012. During this time, the band toured the US repeatedly, as well as the UK with their friends/heroes, The Wedding Present. 2014's Jukebox Memoir saw the band joined on vocals by still more friends/heroes: Adam Franklin from Swervedriver and Mark Gardener of Ride (on track 2: "Come Lie Down"). Accolades followed 2015's "Destroy. Rebuild." and 2017's "At the End of the World," but touring did not. The band was demoing their 8th record when COVID hit, and pre-production ceased.

The Jet Age formed in 2005 after singer/guitarist Eric Tischler's previous indie rock band, The Hurricane Lamps (1995–2004; 5 LPs and a Bus Stop Label 7", multiple national tours) folded when drummer Jason Merriman decided to attend graduate school and bassist Greg Bennett planned to move overseas. Dave Meyer, a Hurricane Lamps fan, agreed to play bass and introduced Tischler to Pete Nuwayser. Shortly before beginning to record the band's first album, Breathless, Meyer moved to Colorado (his then fiancée, and now spouse, accepted a teaching position with a university there). Bennett's relocation plan had changed by that time, so Tischler quickly asked him to resume playing bass.

== Members ==
- Eric Tischler: guitars, vocals, keyboards
- Greg Bennett: bass
- Pete Nuwayser: drums, vocals (occasionally during live performances)

=== Previous members ===
- Dave Meyer: bass

== Discography ==
- Don't Let Me Leave (Sonic Boomerang Records, 2024)
- At the End of the World (Sonic Boomerang Records, 2017)
- The Ice is Cracked (Sonic Boomerang Records, 2016)
- Your Sweet Nothings (Sonic Boomerang Records, 2016)
- Destroy.Rebuild (Sonic Boomerang Records, 2015)
- Jukebox Memoir (Sonic Boomerang Records, 2013)
- Domestic Disturbances (Sonic Boomerang Records, 2012)
- The Jet Age in 'Love' (Sonic Boomerang Records, 2009)
- What Did You Do During the War, Daddy? (Sonic Boomerang Records, 2008)
- Breathless (Sonic Boomerang Records, 2006)

== Notable press ==
- "https://whenyoumotoraway.blogspot.com/2017/12/the-jet-age-at-end-of-world.html" (2017)
- "https://www.allmusic.com/album/destroy-rebuild-mw0002866926" (2015)
- "https://www.washingtonpost.com/wp-dyn/content/article/2010/06/24/AR2010062402210.html/" (2010)
- "http://blurt-online.com/reviews/view/1870/" (2010)
- "http://www.expressnightout.com/content/2010/01/the-jet-age-in-love.php/"(2010)
- "http://www.portlandmercury.com/portland/riffs-politics-and-plot/Content?oid=825186/" (2008)
- "http://pitchfork.com/reviews/albums/11174-what-did-you-do-during-the-war-daddy/" (2008)
- "http://pitchfork.com/reviews/albums/9685-breathless/"(2006)
- "http://expressnightout.com/content/2006/09/tonights_top_stop_jet_age_at_the_black_c.php/" (2006)
